= List of churches in Iași =

The city of Iași, Romania is home to a large number of historic churches and monasteries. Unless otherwise noted, these belong to the Romanian Orthodox Church.

- Metropolitan Cathedral
- Old Metropolitan Cathedral
- Bărboi Monastery
- Bucium Monastery
- Cetățuia Monastery
- Frumoasa Monastery
- Galata Monastery
- Golia Monastery
- Podgoria Copou Monastery
- Socola Monastery
- Trei Ierarhi Monastery
- Annunciation Church
- Banu Church
- Barnovschi Church
- Curelari Church
- Entry of the Theotokos into the Temple Church
- Holy Forty Martyrs Church
- Holy Trinity Church
- Mitocul Maicilor
- Nicoriță Church
- Ss. Athanasius and Cyrill Church
- Saint Charalambos Church
- Saint Demetrius-Balș Church
- Saint George-Lozonschi Church
- Saint John the Baptist Church
- Saint Lazarus Church
- Saint Nicholas-Ciurchi Church
- Saint Nicholas Princely Church
- Saint Parascheva Church
- Saint Sabbas Church
- Saint Spyridon Church
- Ss. Theodore Church
- Socola Mică Church
- Talpalari Church
- Three Holy Hierarchs Chapel
- Toma Cozma Church
- Vulpe Church
- White Church
- Zlataust Church
- Apostolic Church (New Apostolic)
- Armenian Church (Armenian Apostolic)
- Lipovan Church (Lipovan)
- Assumption of Mary Church (Roman Catholic)
- Our Lady Queen of Iași Cathedral (Roman Catholic)
