= Saint John the Baptist Church, Iași =

Heritage site in Iași County, Romania

Coordinates: 47.1652°N 27.5848°E

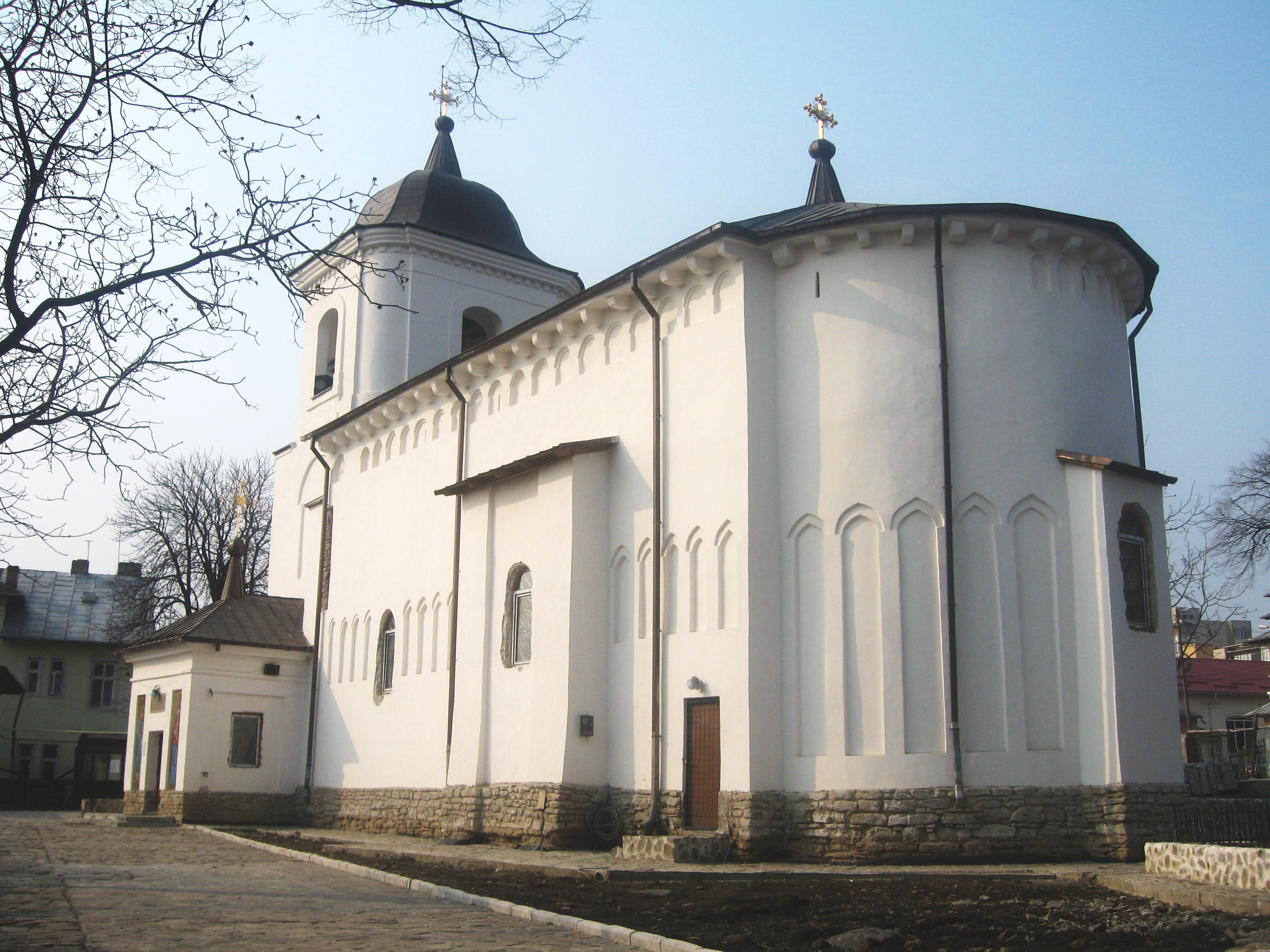
Saint John the Baptist Church

Saint John the Baptist Church (Romanian: Biserica Tăierea Capului Sfântului Ioan Botezătorul) is a Romanian Orthodox church located at 14 I. C. Brătianu Street in Iași, Romania. It is dedicated to the Beheading of St. John the Baptist.

In 1610, during the reign of Prince Constantin Movilă, a wooden church dedicated to Parascheva of the Balkans was built around the city's fish market. This was later moved to the site of the current church. Upon the insistence of his mother, the nun Elisafta, Prince Miron Barnovschi-Movilă began to build the latter from stone between 1626 and 1629. During his reign, the church was completed up to the top of the windows and a new dedication selected. Beheaded by the Ottomans in 1633, he did not live to see the church complete, as mentioned on a marble plaque above the foyer door. Instead, Vasile Lupu ensured it was finished. It has been suggested that Lupu performed the work out of remorse, as Barnovschi's execution was partly due to his insistences.

When it was done in 1634, it was the first fortified church in Moldavia. The style forms part of the traditional Moldavian architecture, but the bell tower is endowed with parapets. The bridge is entirely fortified, with gaps for arrows and rifles, and a path for lookouts. It has been speculated that the Ottoman ban on repairing military buildings did not apply to churches. The bell, from 1628, is Barnovschi's gift, and was cast at Lviv. The church was associated with the local beggars' guild. Paul of Aleppo visited in 1653, writing that he saw displayed in the nave a portrait of Barnovschi on a white horse. In 1803, upon the request of Metropolitan Veniamin Costache, it became a dependency of the Diocese of Huși.

Repaired in 1854 and 1873, the church had a small foyer added on the southwestern side in 1875. In 1913, the landowner Vasile Rusovici financed an extensive renovation that included a new fence, still in place. Other repairs took place in 1942, 1965 and, following the 1977 Vrancea earthquake, in 1984-1986, with a new round beginning in 2006. The school for church singers in the parish yard functioned until 1948, when it was shut down by the communist regime.

The church is listed as a historic monument by Romania's Ministry of Culture and Religious Affairs.

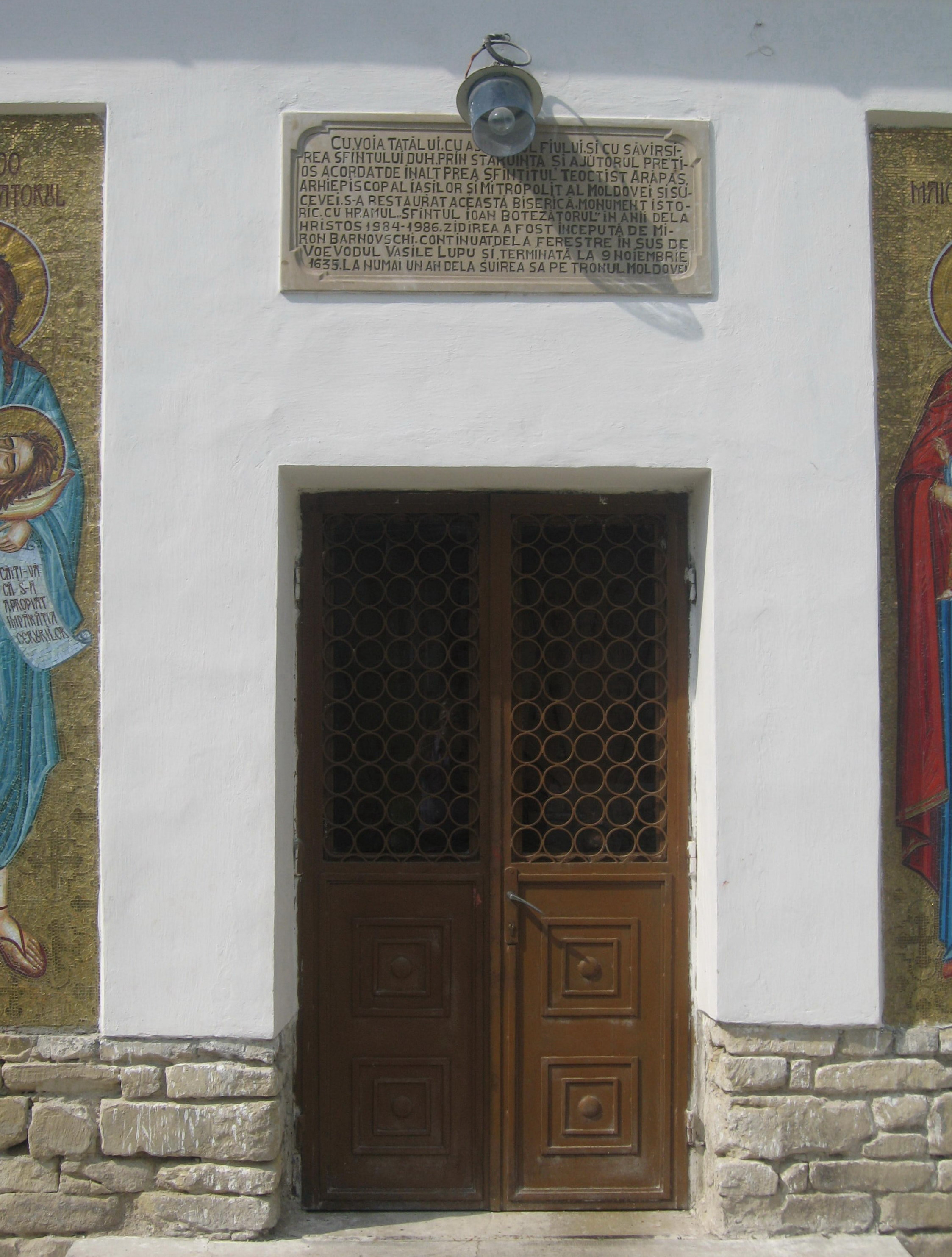
Entrance

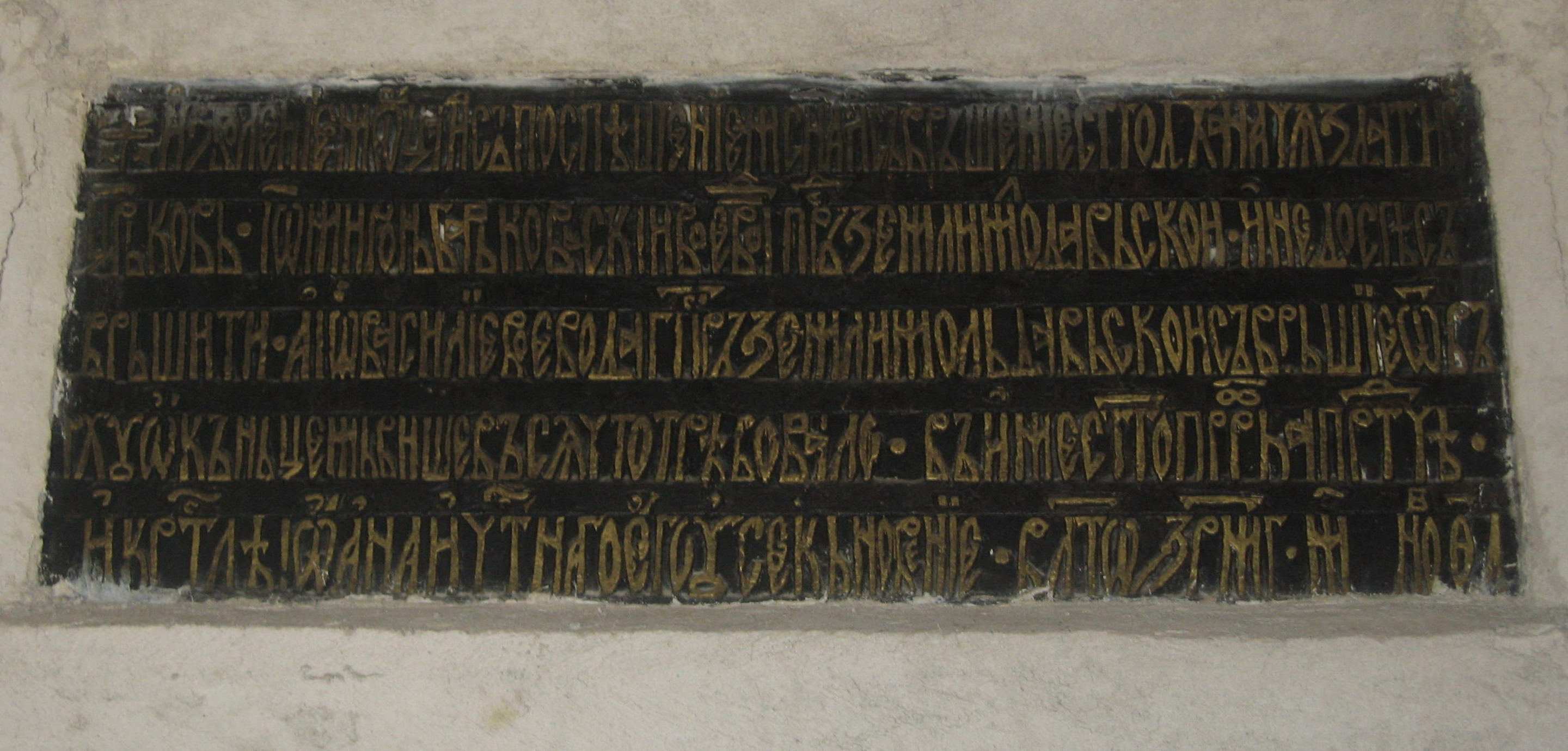
Dedication

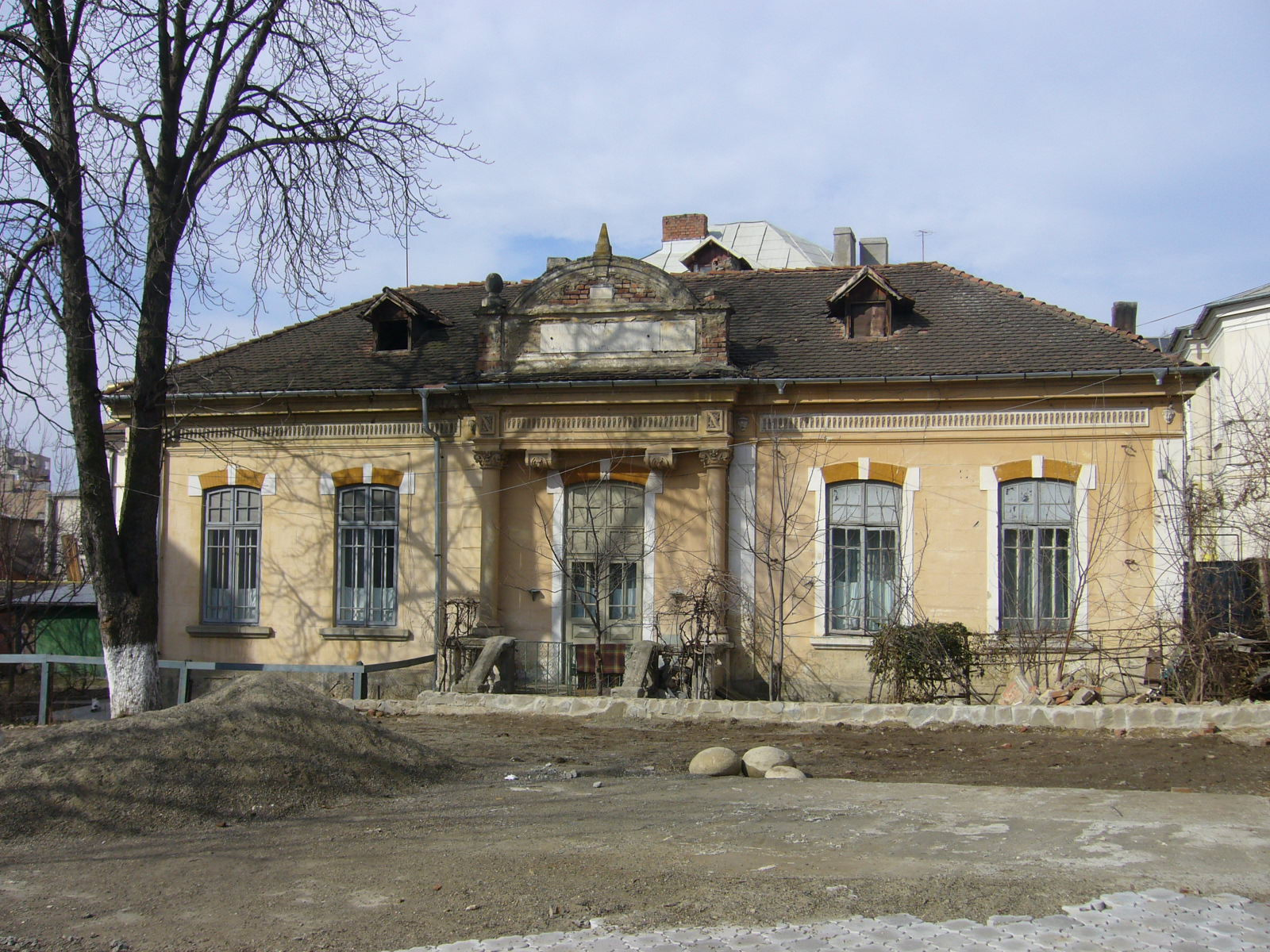
Former church singers' school

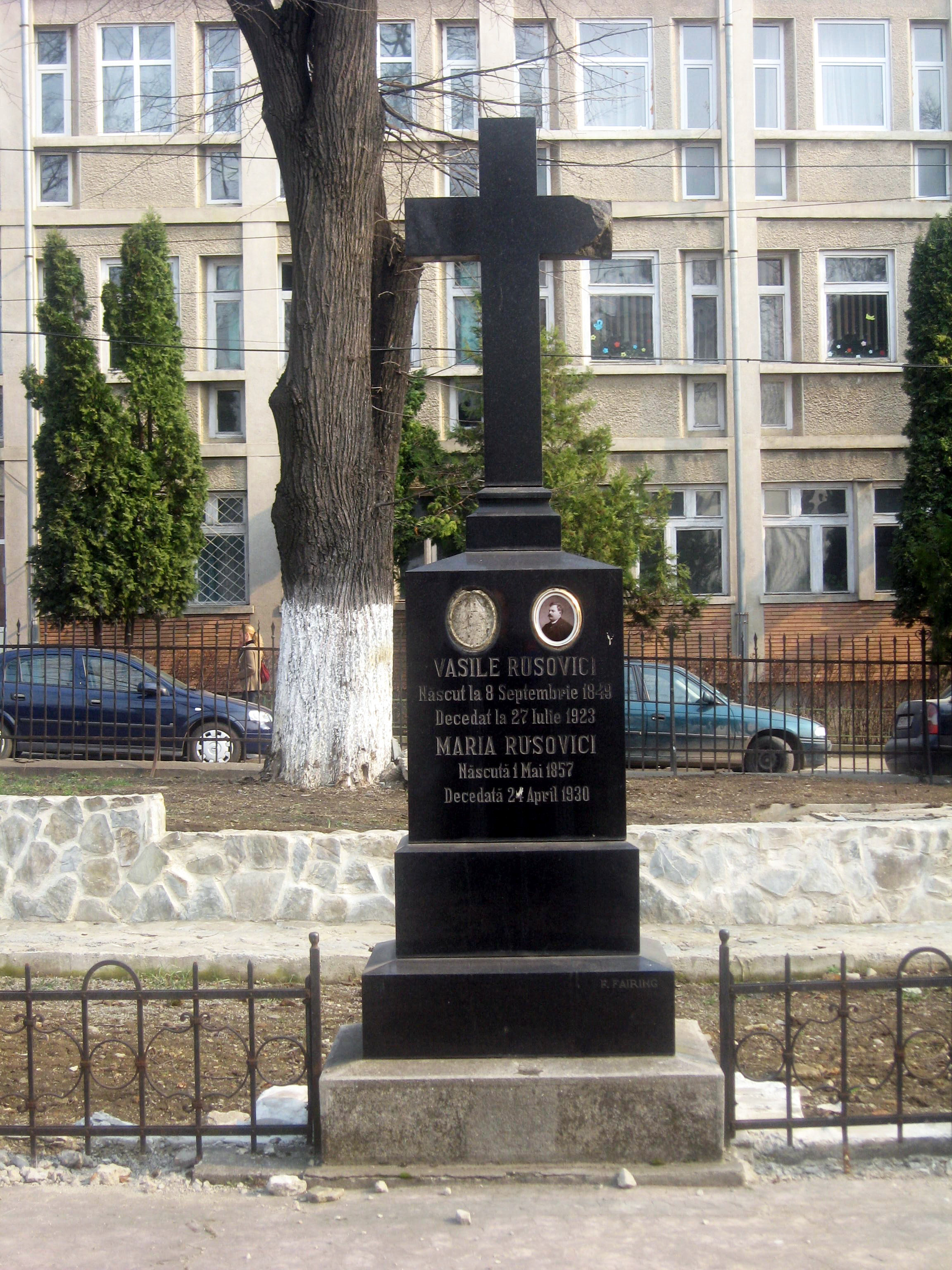
Rusovici grave
