= Toma Cozma Church =

Heritage site in Iași County, Romania

Coordinates: 47.1735°N 27.5650°E

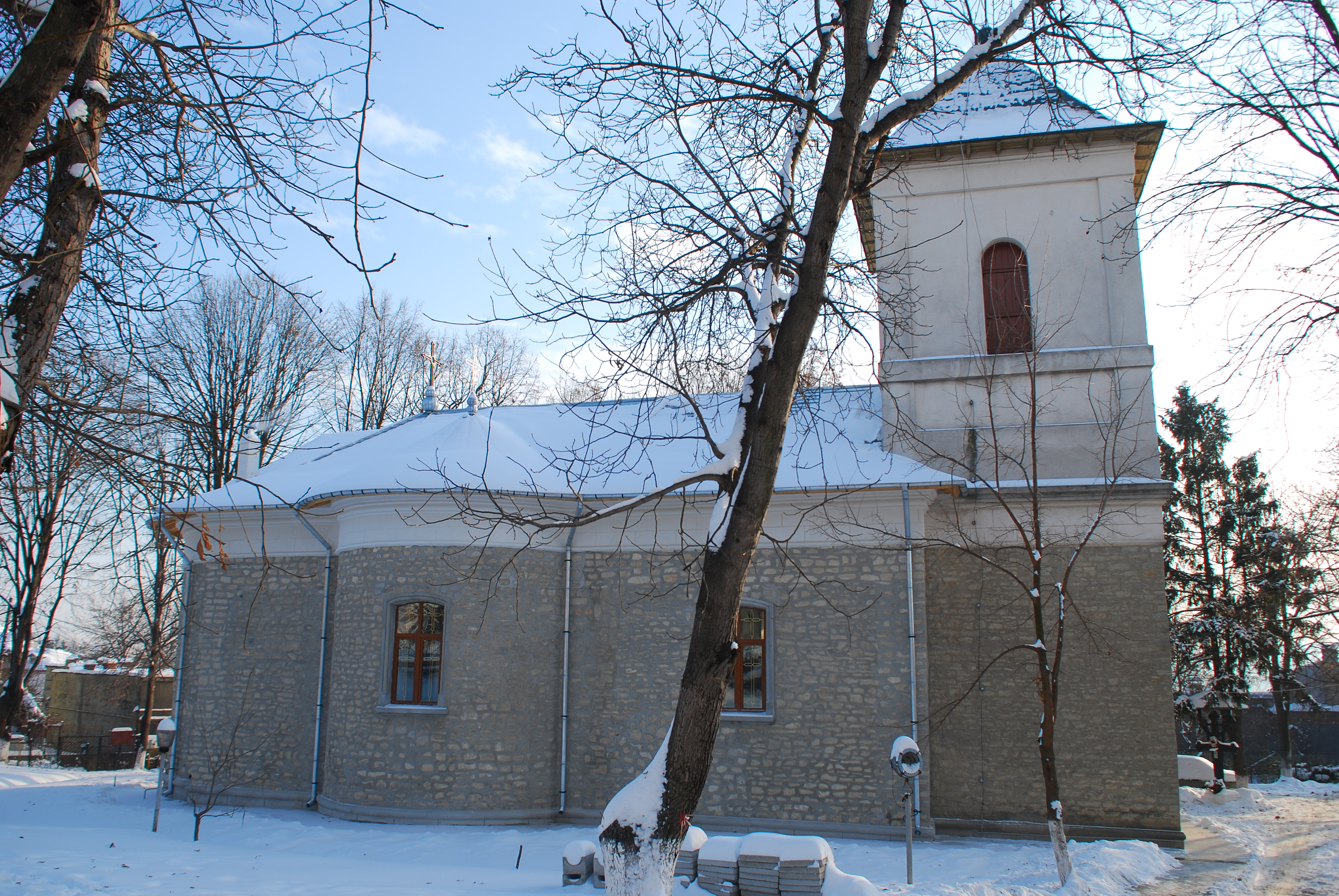
Toma Cozma Church

The Toma Cozma Church (Romanian: Biserica Toma Cozma) is a Romanian Orthodox church located at 4 Școalei Street in Iași, Romania. It is dedicated to Thomas the Apostle and to Catherine of Alexandria.

The church was built in 1807 on the west face of Muntenimii Hill, offering a view over the northwestern part of the city. The initial ktitors were Toma Cozma and his wife Ecaterina; he was a local boyar who steadily rose through the ranks: șetrar, medelnicer, paharnic and ban. It has been suggested that he was of Roma origin. The church he built was small and simple in form, without spires. It was made a metochion of Iviron on Mount Athos, and was known as the church of the potters' guild. The next ktitorissa, Maria Anastasiu Apostol Ketreanca, added a bell tower during an 1847 reparation, as attested on a plaque on the western wall. It is this inscription that notes the 1807 construction date. However, the icon of Saint Thomas, to the right of the entrance, shows the ktitor as a paharnic, indicating a date for the icon before 1806, when he was elevated to ban. As icons were ordered near the point of a church's completion, it is possible the building was finished around 1804. Maria also expanded the vestibule, built a space for vestments on the south facade and a surrounding wall.

Part of the vestibule ceiling collapsed in 1924. Repairs were undertaken in 1930-1932: the spire was rebuilt in brick, while exterior buttresses and an interior balcony for the choir were added. During World War II, the church was located in the vicinity of where German troops were quartered. On August 20, 1944, it was bombed and the altar area collapsed in flames. Repairs took place between 1950 and 1954. Following the 1977 Vrancea earthquake, the bell tower was reinforced in 1980–1982. The church is made of stone, in a trefoil plan, with two powerful buttresses. The altar and side apses are circular on the interior and exterior. There is a small foyer.

A primary school functioned near the church during the 19th century, giving rise to the name of the street on which it is located. Also, a boys' primary school where Ion Creangă taught was temporarily housed there. Eunuchs from the Păcurari district formed part of the congregation. The Toma Cozma Popular Athenaeum was housed in the church in the first part of the 20th century. This institution hosted cultural meetings, edited a magazine, founded lecture halls and ran a choir and theater troupe. In 1929, it raised a monument to Mihai Eminescu that since 1957 has sat near the Central University Library. A. D. Xenopol was baptized in the church. The church walls feature nine large icons in 1837 by the Italian Giovanni Schiavoni, and ordered by Veniamin Costache. Another, showing Ss. Peter and John, is by Octav Băncilă. The church's property includes liturgical objects such as a Gospel Book and 19th-century communion boxes, censers and crosses; sculpted candlesticks, pulpits and choirs; the carved oak iconostasis, richly ornamented and painted with neo-Byzantine icons; and the altar, with old icons and valuable liturgical books. It is rumored that in the past, the church owned a fragment of the Virgin Mary's dress and of Christ's burial shroud. On the northern part of the churchyard, there is a common grave set up after World War II and marked by a cross.

The church is listed as a historic monument by Romania's Ministry of Culture and Religious Affairs, as is the parish house, which dates to the end of the 19th century.

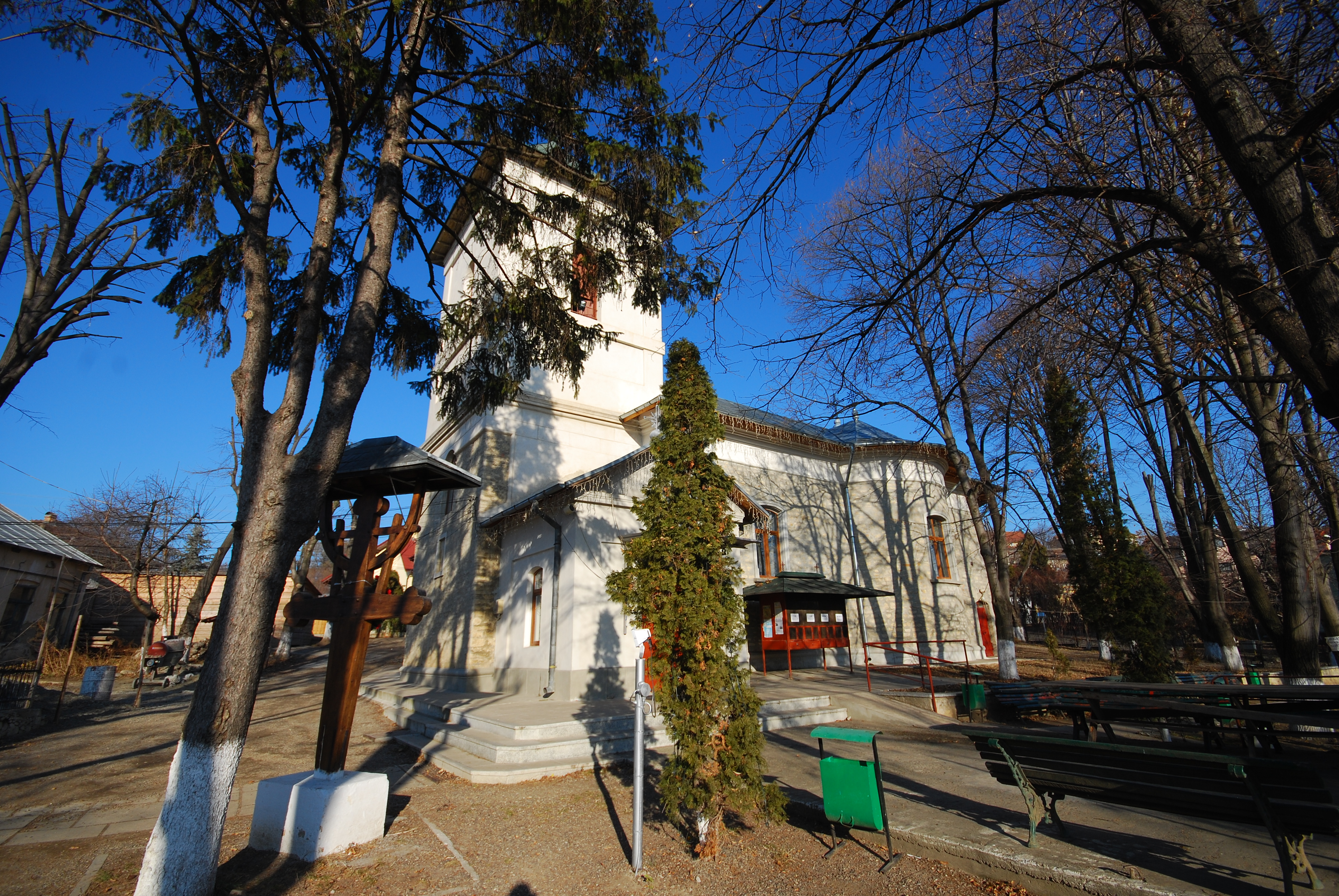
Setting

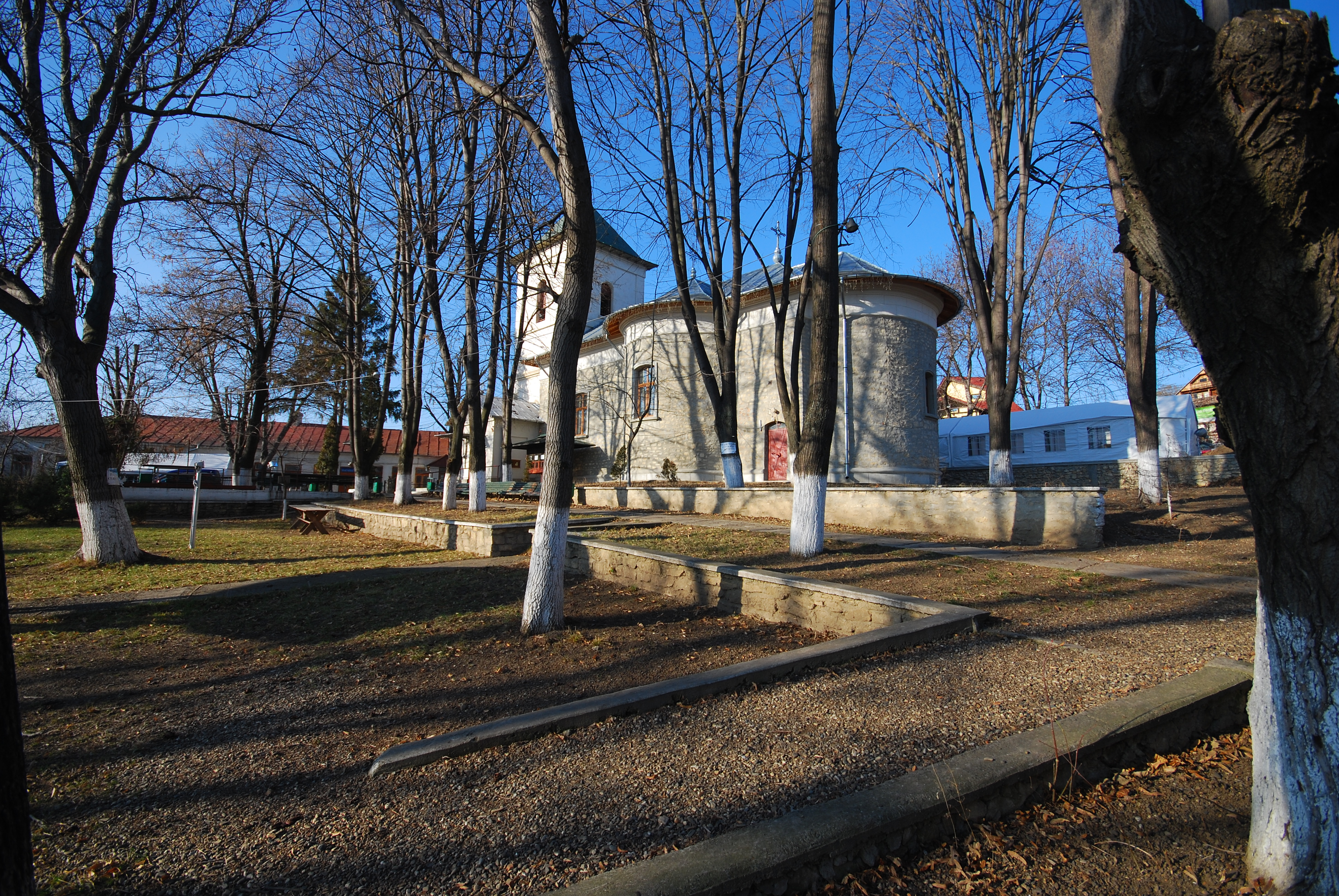
East end
