= White Church, Iași =

Heritage site in Iași County, Romania

Coordinates: 47°09′46″N 27°35′43″E

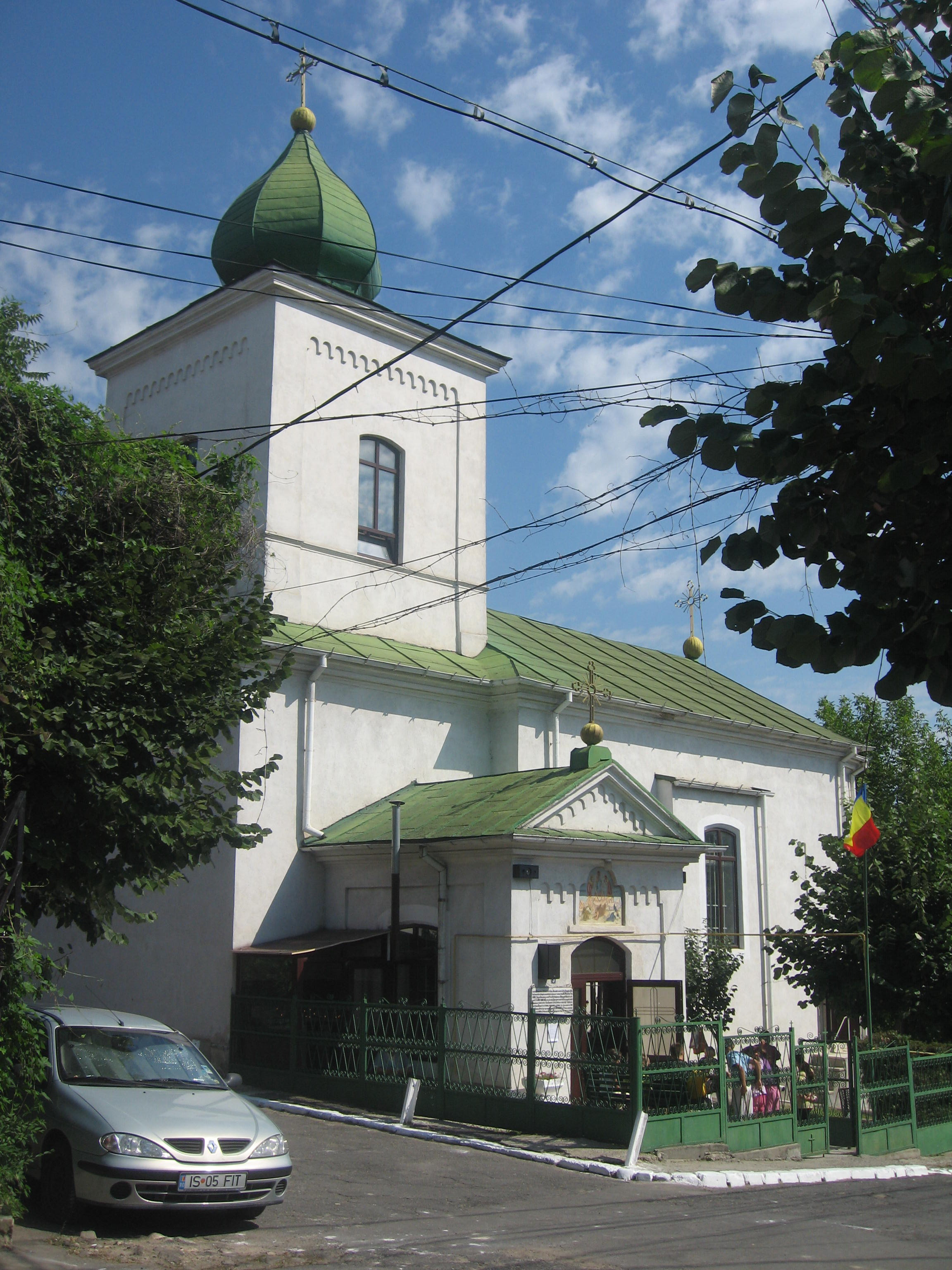
White Church

The White Church (Romanian: Biserica Albă) is a Romanian Orthodox church located at 3 Alba Road in Iași, Romania. It is dedicated to the Transfiguration of Jesus.

The first church on the site, dedicated to the Nativity of Jesus, was made of wooden beams varnished in white, which gave rise to the nickname. It was built before 1600 and first mentioned in 1682. Because guild members lived in the vicinity of the church at the time of its construction, it is believed to have been built by a guild. The new church was built in 1750 by Popa Velișco, and by the market-dealers' guild. The graves located around the church were transferred to Eternitatea cemetery in 1887.

A restoration took place in 1885, during the reign of Metropolitan Iosif Naniescu, and was financed by parishioners and the city hall. In 1901, Naniescu re-blessed the church and conferred the new dedication, possibly given because of its changed appearance. Interior repairs were done in 1913 and exterior in 1959. In 1971, the structure was strengthened by adding reinforced concrete and fixing the roof. The interior was painted in fresco from 1974 to 1978. The original iconostasis was removed and taken to Golia Monastery for safekeeping; the current one was set up in 1978. A cross dedicated to the aviators who died in World War II was set up in the yard in 1975; there is a grave marker from the old cemetery in front of this, but only the year 1841 can be read. The church collection includes 41 icons donated by Zoița Aramă, who died in 1818.

The church is listed as a historic monument by Romania's Ministry of Culture and Religious Affairs, having received the designation in 1962.

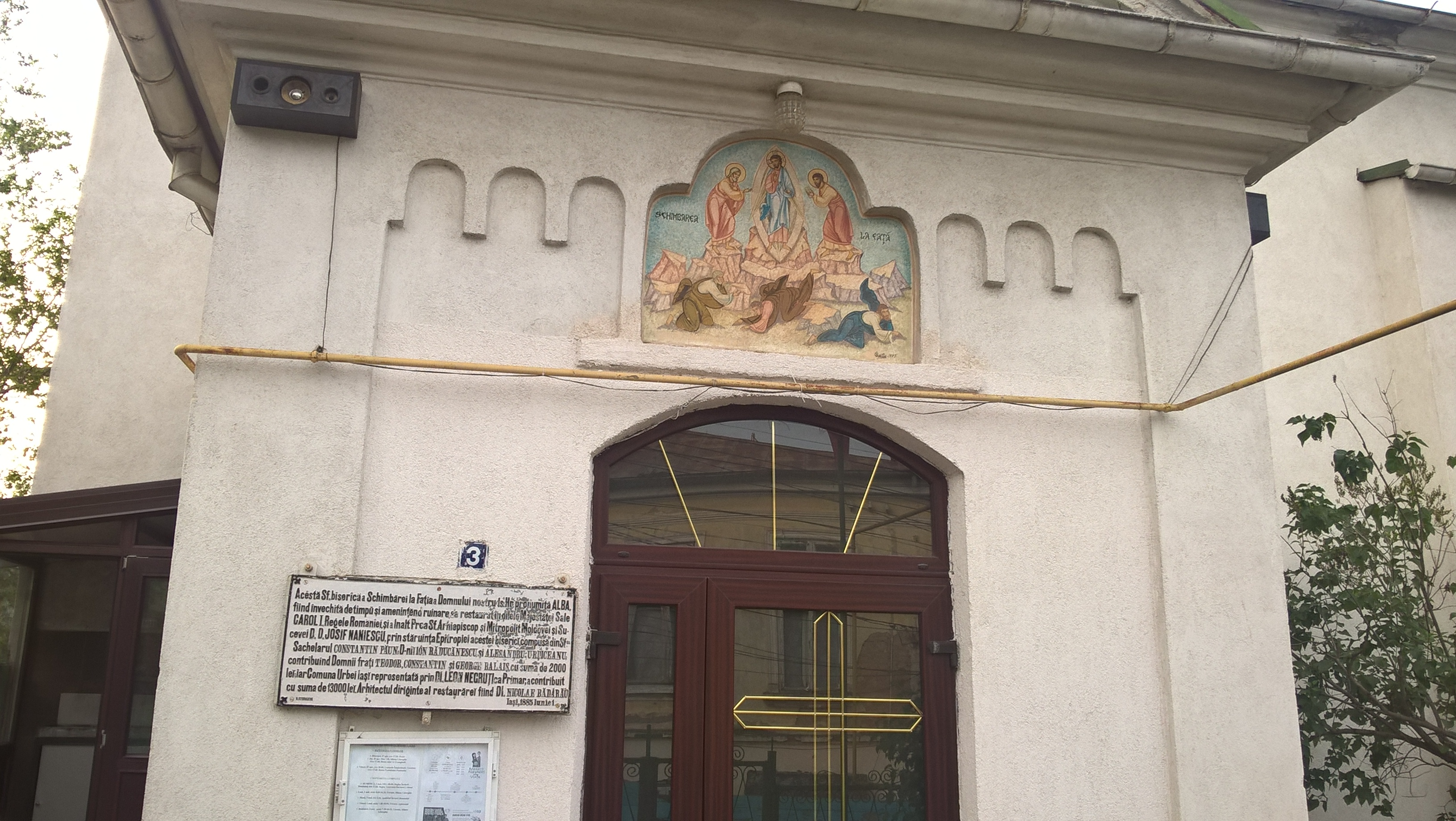
Entrance

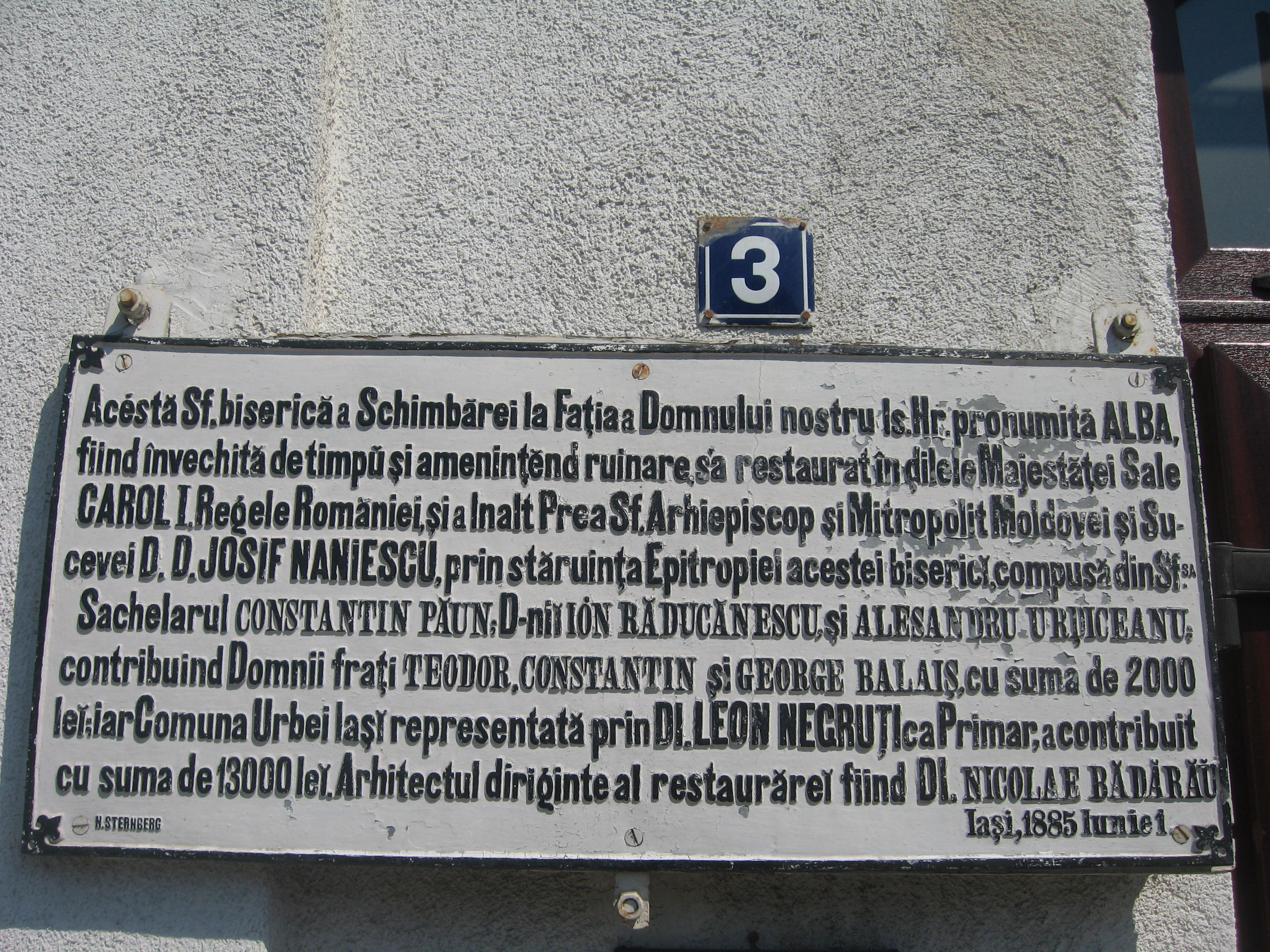
Exterior dedication

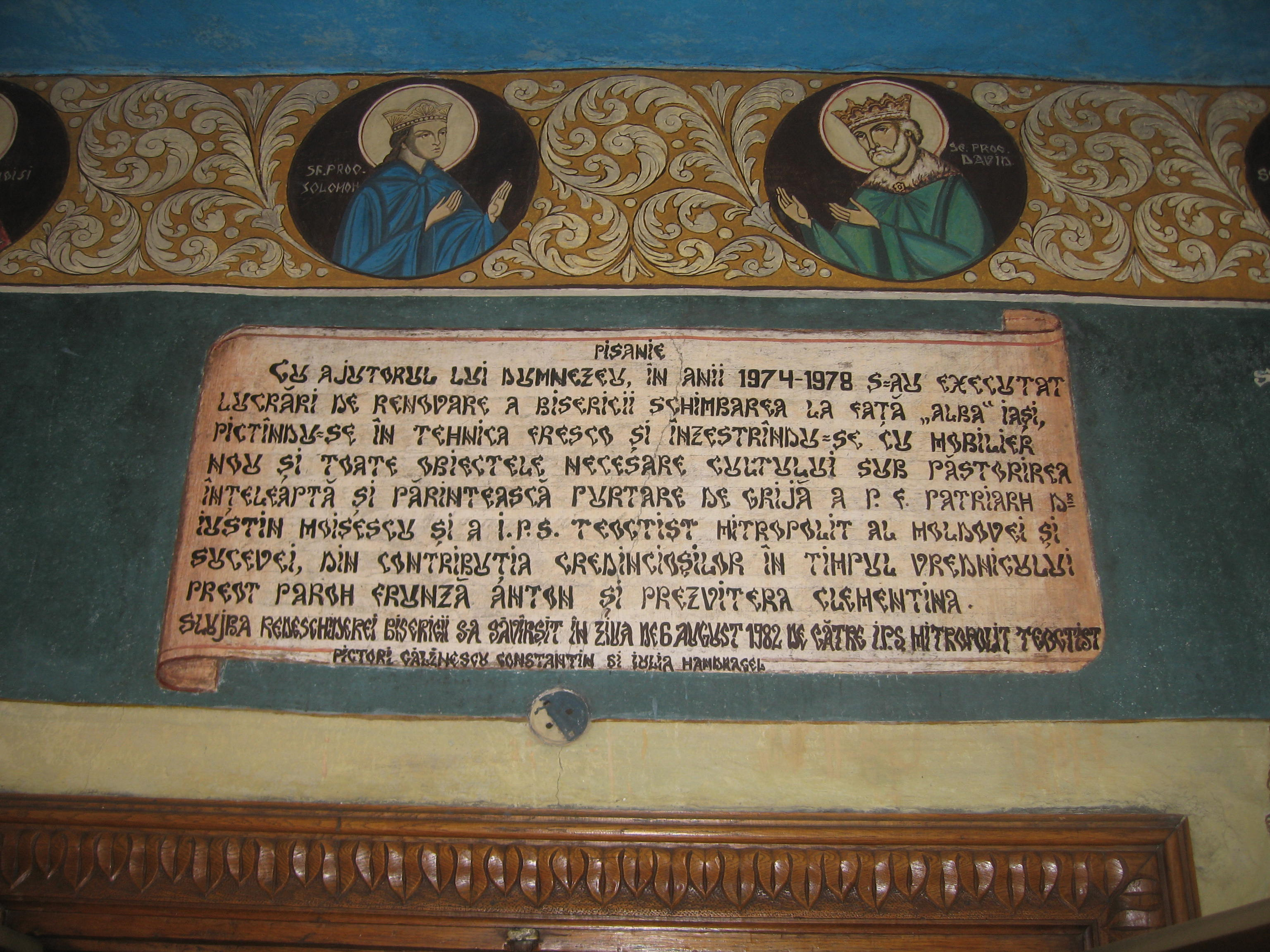
Interior dedication
