= Saint Lazarus Church, Iași =

Heritage site in Iași County, Romania

Coordinates: 47°09′31″N 27°35′29″E

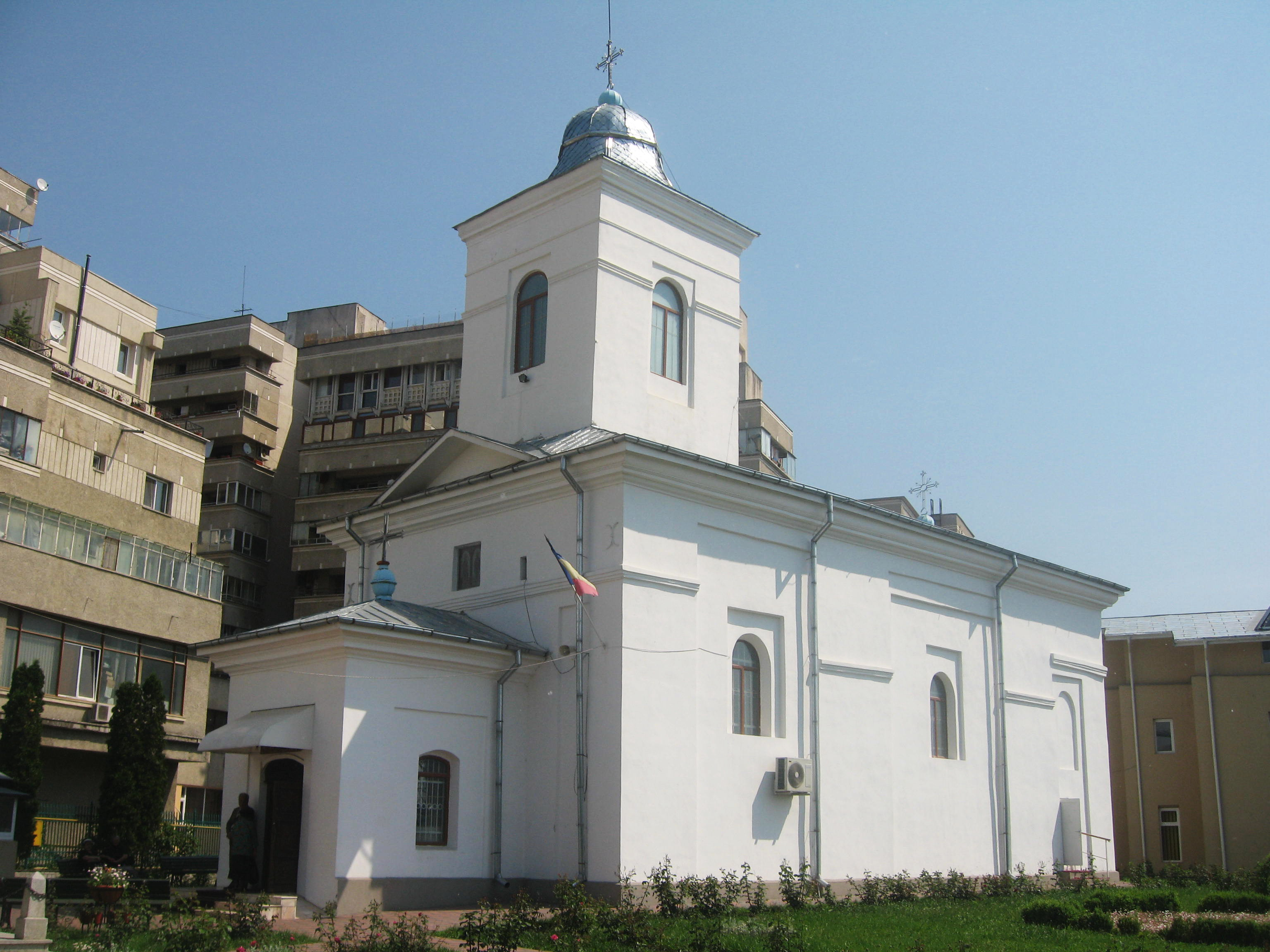
Saint Lazarus Church

Saint Lazarus Church (Romanian: Biserica Sfântul Lazăr) is a Romanian Orthodox church located at 1 Dimitrie Gusti Street in Iași, Romania. It is dedicated to Lazarus of Bethany and to Catherine of Alexandria.

The first church on the site was built of wood in 1703-1704 and was dedicated to Lazarus. Its ktitor was Prince Mihai Racoviță. Located near the princely customs house and close to Racoviță's family homes, it was situated atop a hill which at the time adjoined the eastern edge of the city. Its location gave it the nickname of Customs House Church (Biserica de la Vamă). It is mentioned in the chronicle of Ion Neculce, and in several documents of the 18th century. The church was burned by the Ottomans. It was rebuilt in brick, on a stone foundation, in 1785, the new ktitors being Sandu and Luca Grigorie. The same year, it was turned into a monastery dedicated to the Holy Sepulchre. Greek monks moved in, building residences and cells on the ruins of the Racoviță properties. The Greeks also brought relics of Saint Charalambos, Theodore Stratelates and a Saint Michael; these are kept today in the nave, in a silvered box with Greek inscriptions. There is a piece of the True Cross in the altar. Outside the church, near the north wall, there is a marble gravestone inscribed in the Romanian Cyrillic alphabet.

The church burned around 1822 and was repaired by Luca Grigorie working with one Sandu; they fixed the roof, siding and adjoining buildings. In 1863, following the secularization of monastic estates in Romania, the monastery was closed, its properties seized, and the Greek monks departed. It became a filial holding of the Barnovschi Church and was subsidized by Iași City Hall. According to historian N. A. Bogdan, at the beginning of the 20th century, the remains of walls and foundations belonging to the Racoviță properties were still visible. The church suffered serious damage during the 1940 Vrancea earthquake and the 1977 Vrancea earthquake; it underwent major repairs in 1967, during the 1980s and from 2006 to 2009. As a result of construction in the surrounding area between 1977-1987, excavations were performed that unearthed several hundred human skeletons. These were later reburied.

The shape of the church is rectangular, with a semicircular altar wall. The interior has a foyer, vestibule, nave and altar; the foyer is lower and separated from the vestibule by several steps. The vestibule features a lengthy list of the church's benefactors. The church is listed as a historic monument by Romania's Ministry of Culture and Religious Affairs.

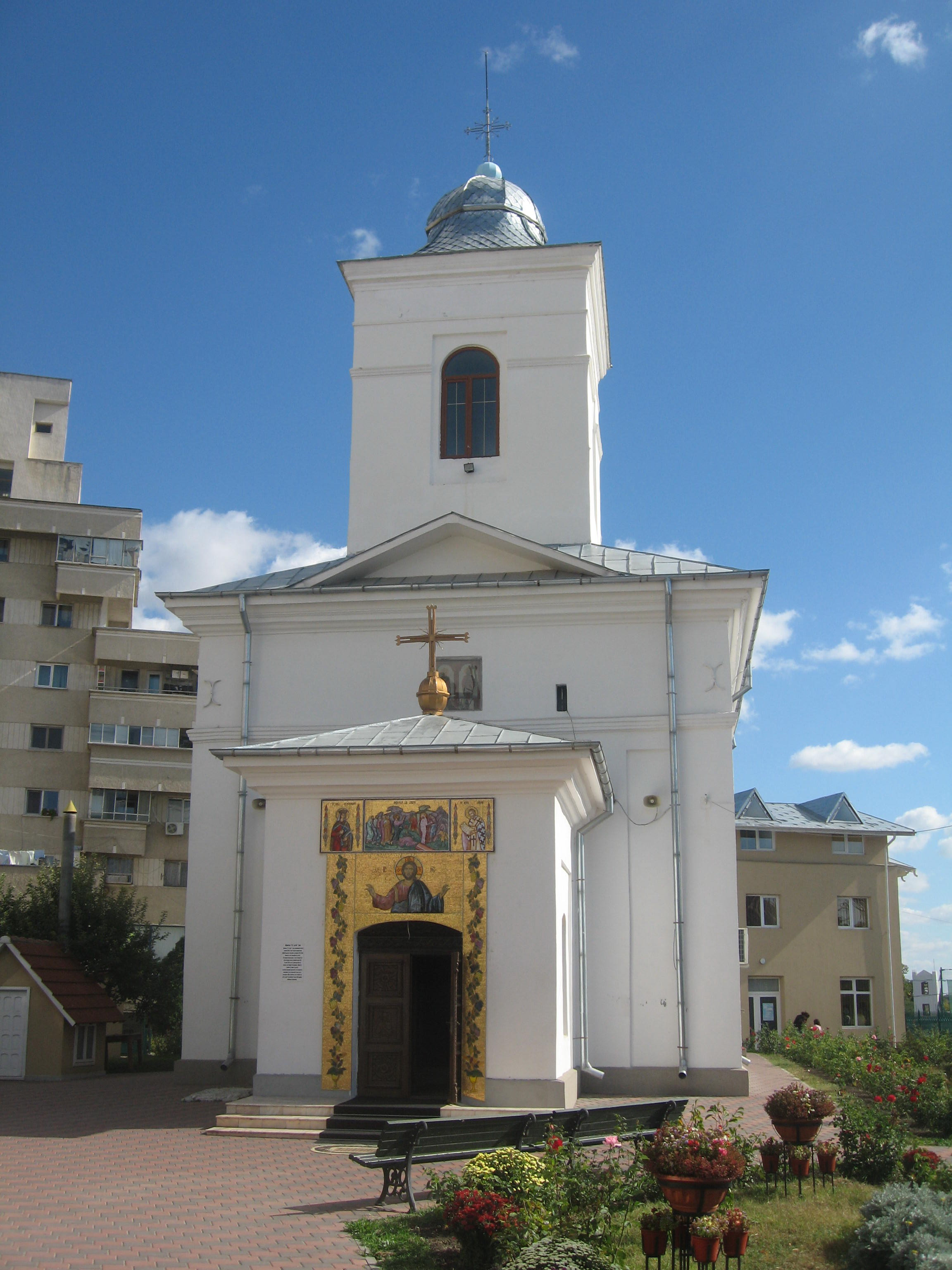
Entrance

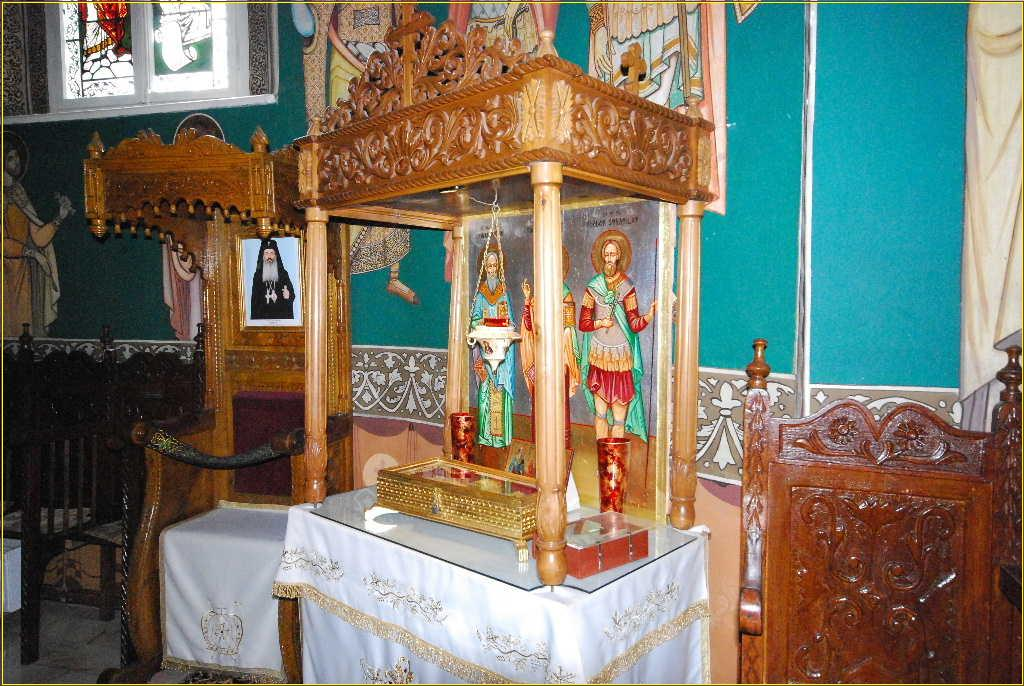
Reliquary

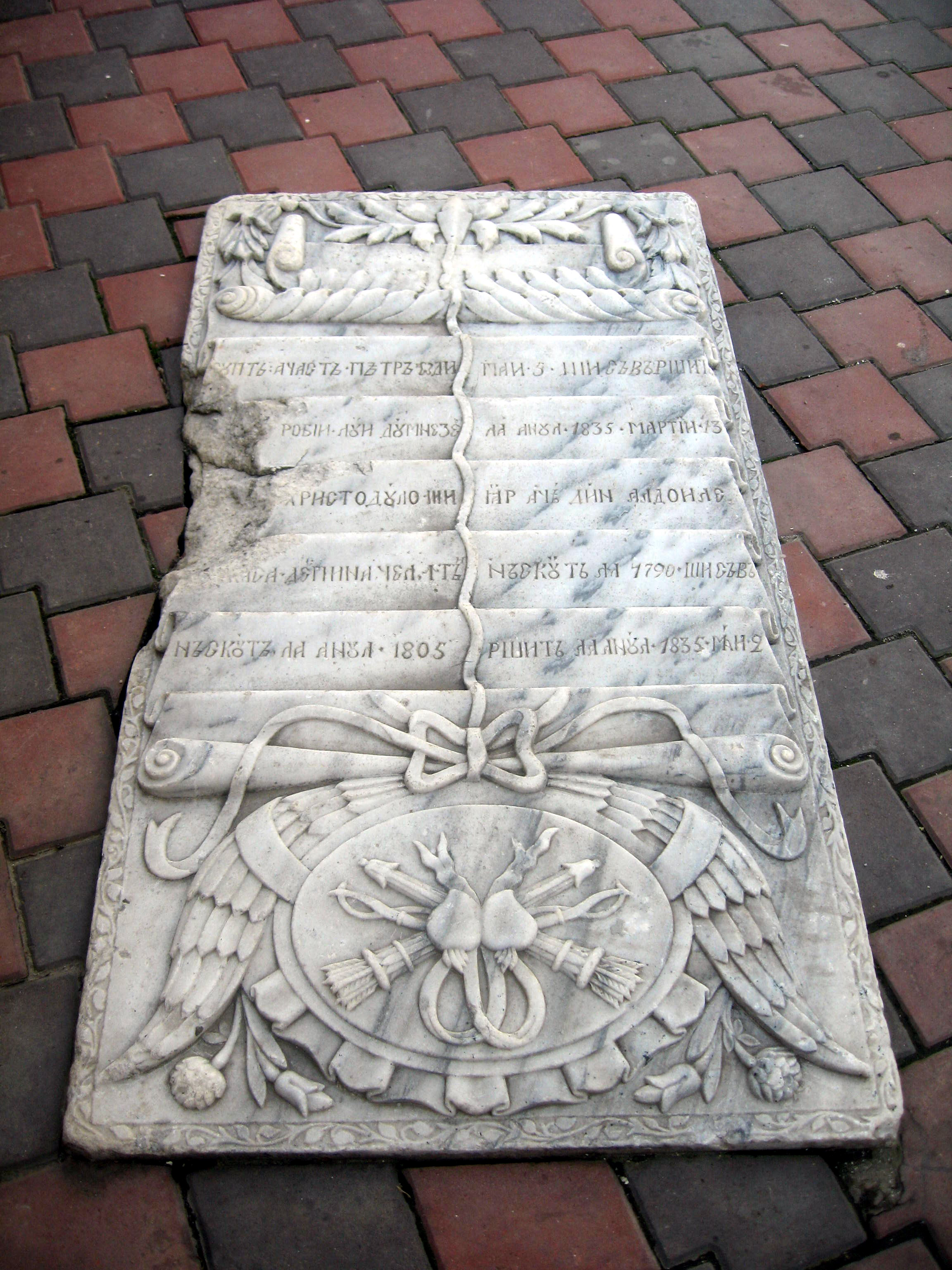
Gravestone

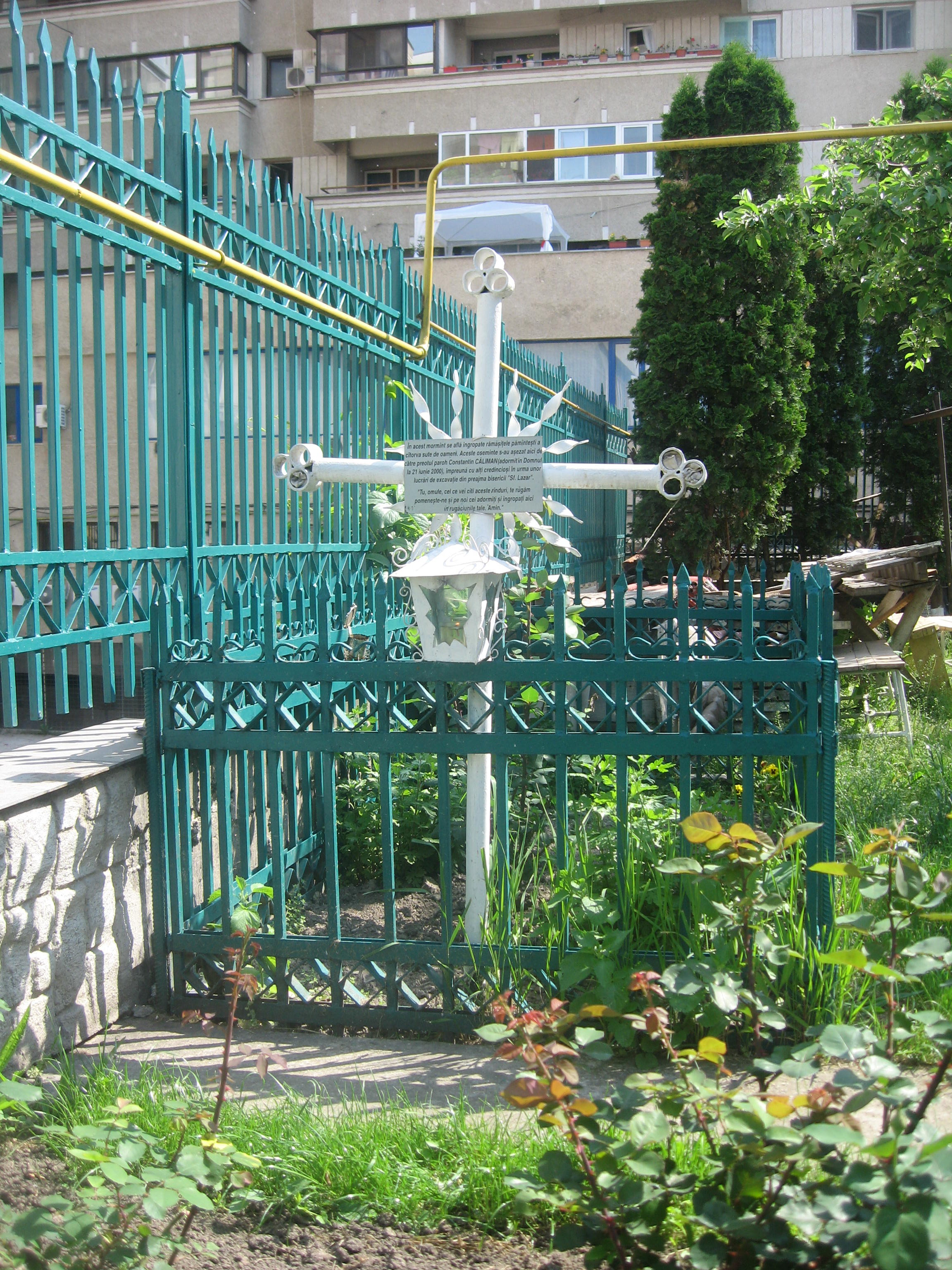
Cross marking reburied remains
