= Ss. Theodore Church =

Heritage site in Iași County, Romania

Coordinates: 47°10′02″N 27°35′15″E

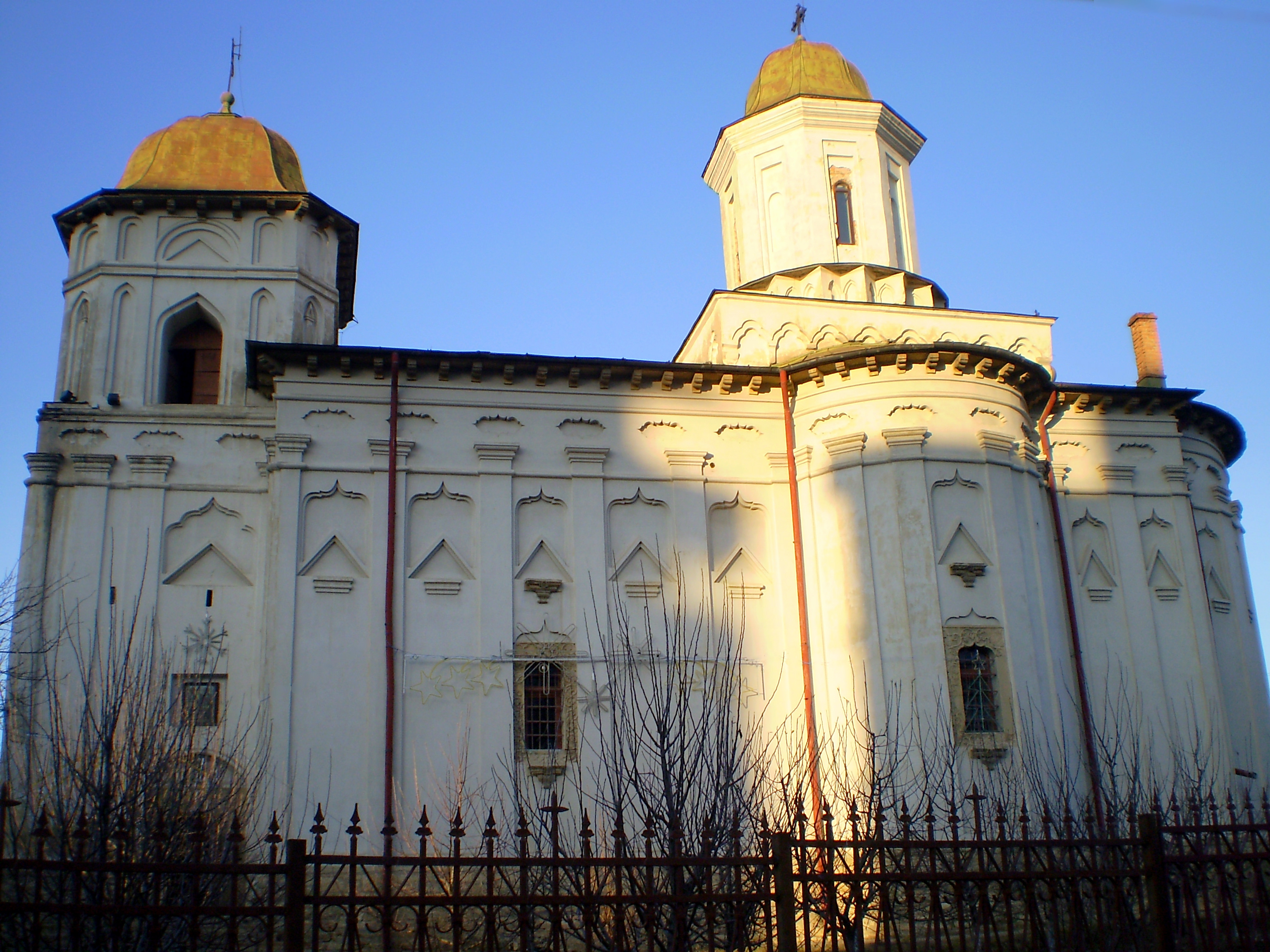
Ss. Theodore Church

Ss. Theodore Church (Romanian: Biserica Sfinții Teodori) is a Romanian Orthodox church located at 14 Sfântul Teodor Street in Iași, Romania. It is dedicated to Saints Theodore of Amasea and Theodore Stratelates.

The first church on the site was made of wood. Historians initially believed it was built by Prince Eustratie Dabija (reigned 1661-1665) and his wife Dafina. However, in 1902, Gheorghe Ghibănescu deciphered the Romanian Cyrillic inscriptions on two icons, finding that while the church was constructed under Dabija, the ktitors were vornic Solomon Bârlădeanul and his wife Maria. A document of 1669 attests the church's existence. It burned in 1735 and 1760. The present stone church is thought to date to 1761 and was financed by the nun Sofia, the daughter of a jitnicer and a widow.

Around 1783, after Sofia's death, the church was in need of repairs, while the cojoc-makers' guild was looking for a place to worship. Thus, the church came into their hands, and the new occupants rebuilt the spire roofs and exterior siding, adding a new style of ornament later copied by numerous churches in the area. They added numerous religious books to its collection, candelabras brought from Russia and a clock installed in the main spire. The guilders also donated a collection of books printed at Râmnic in 1779-1780.

The iconostasis is unique in Moldavia. Carved in rosewood, it has icons dating to Dabija's reign: those depicting Christ, the Virgin Mary, Ss. Theodore and Saint Nicholas were probably painted by Grigore Zugravul in 1665, and come from the old wooden church. The cojocari probably added a row of icons during their heyday; researchers have noted a difference in style consonant with two different time periods. The guilders were associated with the church for roughly a century. Due to industrial advances, their guild system broke down around 1920. The church was hit by a bomb in 1944, during World War II, and repaired in 1952. The repainting process degraded the appearance of the interior.

The church combines Baroque, Turkish, Moldavian and Wallachian influences, typical of the final quarter of the 18th century. It resembles several Iași churches of the period, while the window decorations are visibly influenced by Golia Monastery. It is listed as a historic monument by Romania's Ministry of Culture and Religious Affairs.

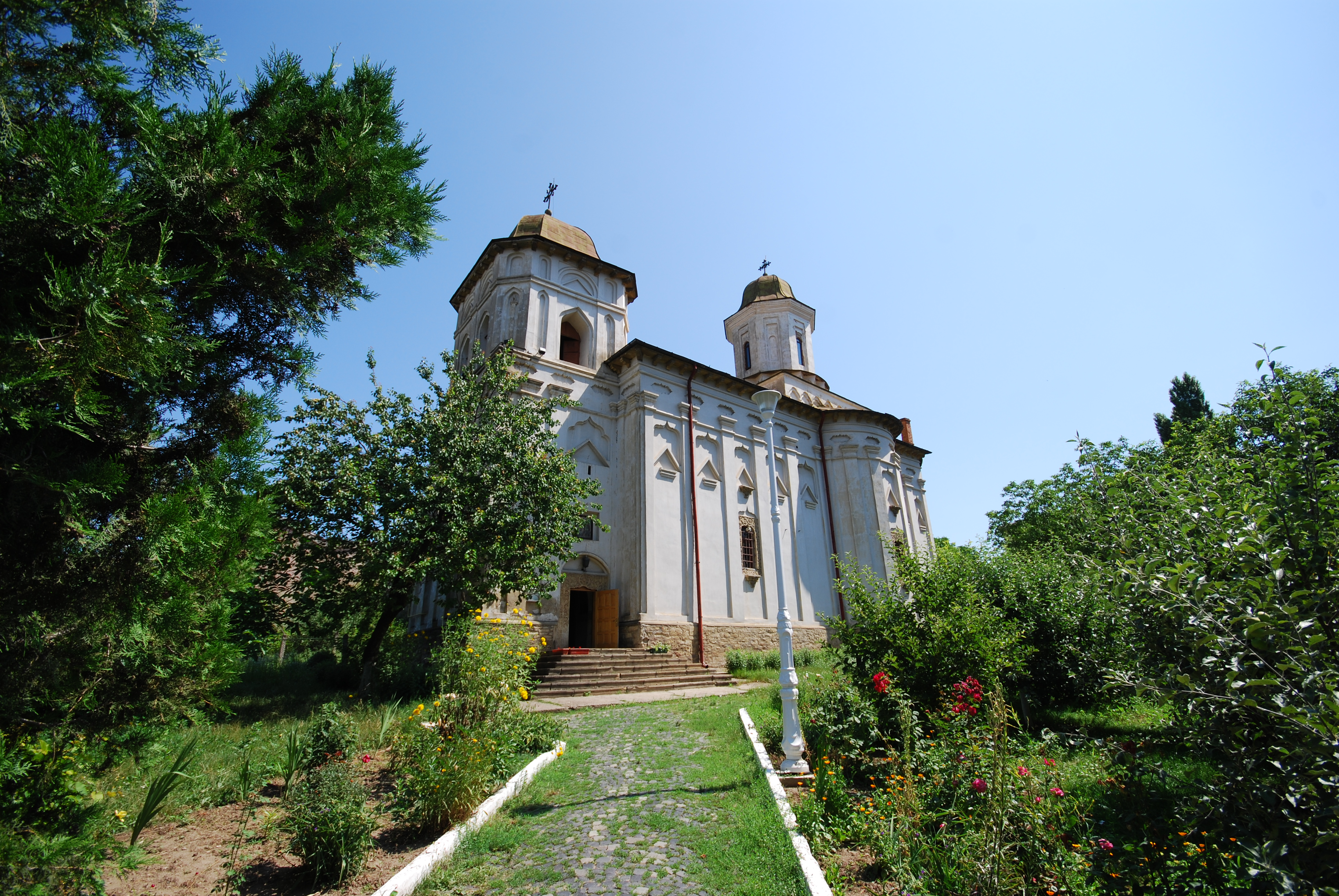
Setting

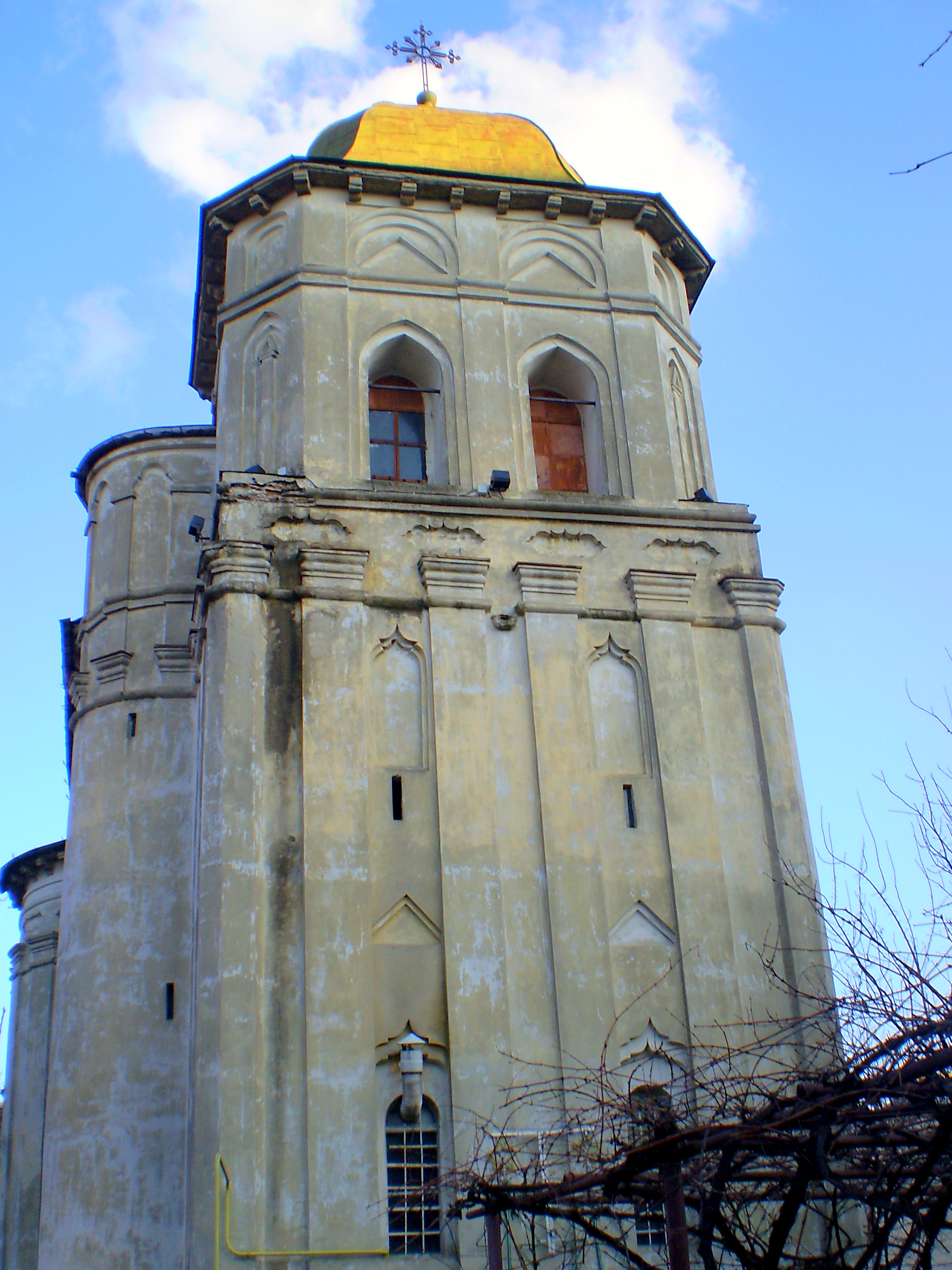
Side view
