= Apostolic Church, Iași =

New Apostolic church in Iași, Romania

Coordinates: 47.1615°N 27.5959°E

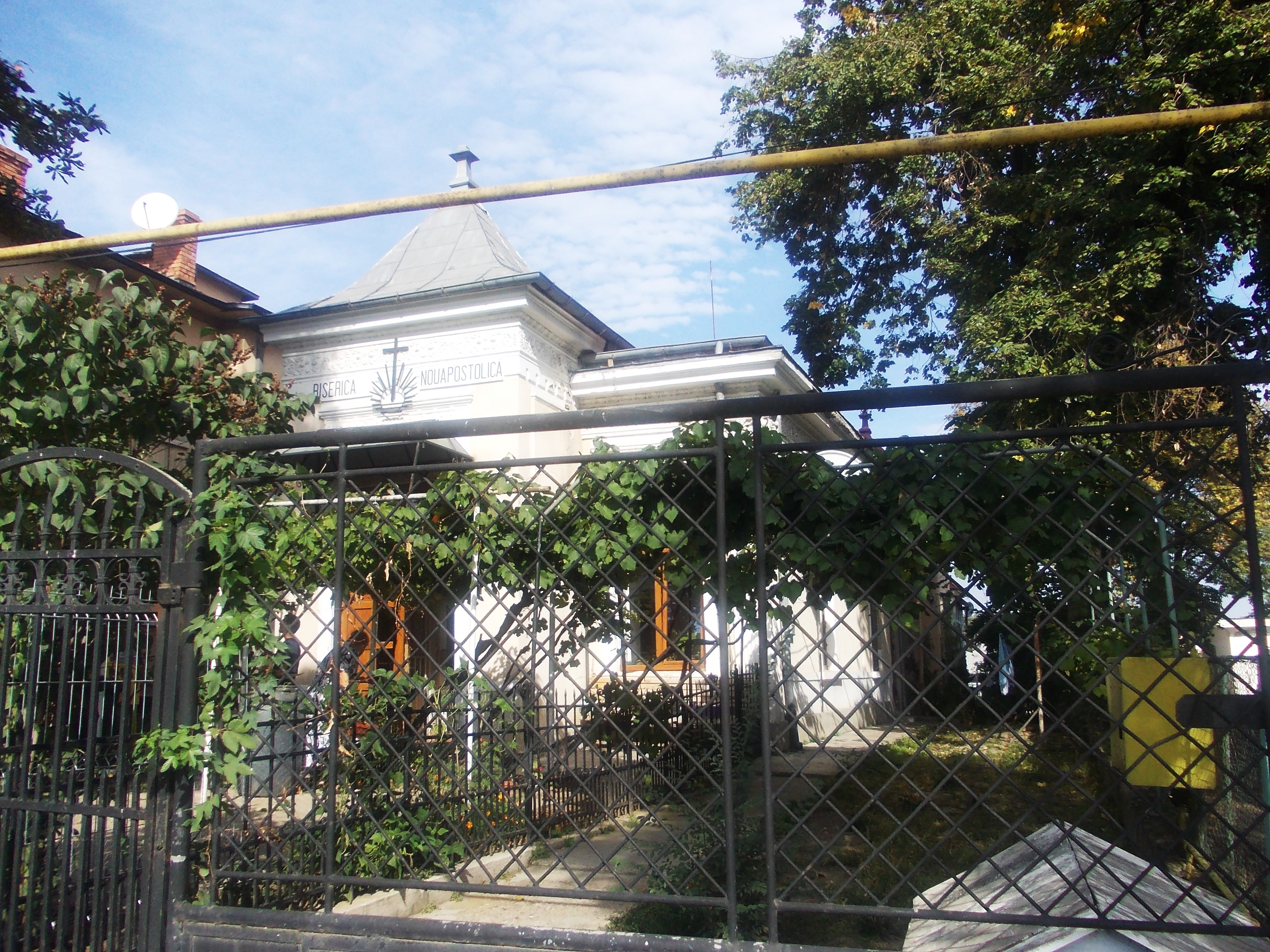
Apostolic Church

The Apostolic Church (Romanian: Biserica Apostolică) is a New Apostolic church located at 35 Elena Doamna Street in Iași, Romania.

The church was built at the beginning of the 20th century. It is listed as a historic monument by Romania's Ministry of Culture and Religious Affairs.
