= Saint Nicholas-Ciurchi Church =

Heritage site in Iași County, Romania

Coordinates: 47.1595°N 27.6090°E

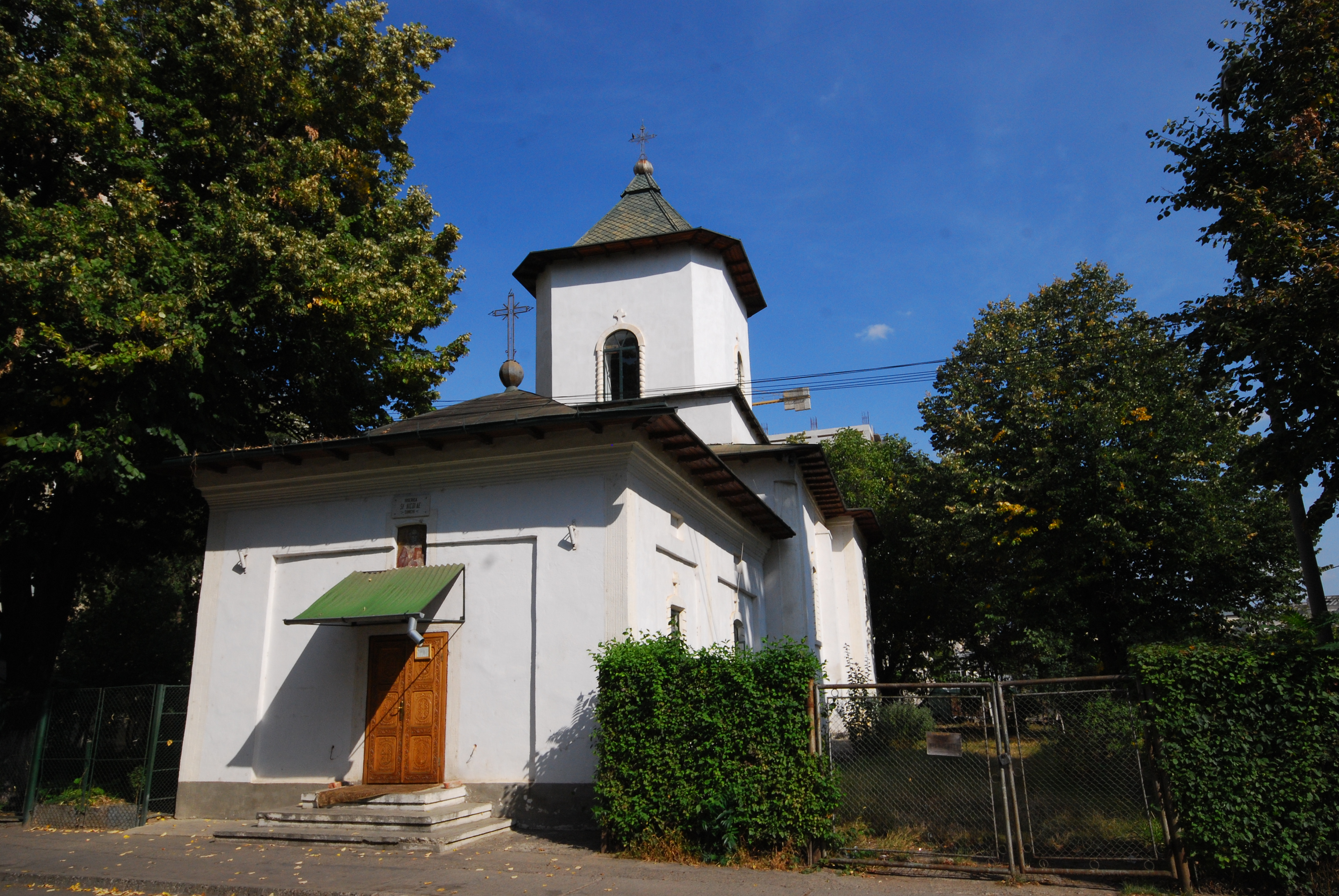
Saint Nicholas-Ciurchi Church

Saint Nicholas-Ciurchi Church (Romanian: Biserica Sfântul Nicolae-Ciurchi) is a Romanian Orthodox church located at 70 Vasile Lupu Street in Iași, Romania. It is dedicated to Saint Nicholas.

Located on the summit of Tătărași Hill, the church was built of stone and brick in its current form from 1810 to 1813 by two priests and their parishioners. It stands on the site of an older church, first mentioned in 1754. There is a spire above the vestibule, and a foyer was added in 1842. The iconostasis is made of artistically carved wood, combining Baroque and Renaissance style. Aside from icons, it features engravings of symbolic figures and vegetation. Its icons of Christ, the Virgin Mary, Saint Nicholas and the Archangels are decorated in silver. The nave also features an icon of the Life-giving Spring, encased in silver.

The walls were painted in oil in 1924. This deteriorated over time, so that they were repainted in fresco from 1989 to 1991. Two old houses belonging to the parish were demolished during systematization. In 1994, following the Romanian Revolution, a new chapel was built, the old framework replaced, and the roof covered in tin. An area for lighting candles was set up in 2000.

The church is listed as a historic monument by Romania's Ministry of Culture and Religious Affairs.
