= Zlataust Church =

Heritage site in Iași County, Romania

Coordinates: 47°09′35″N 27°35′50″E

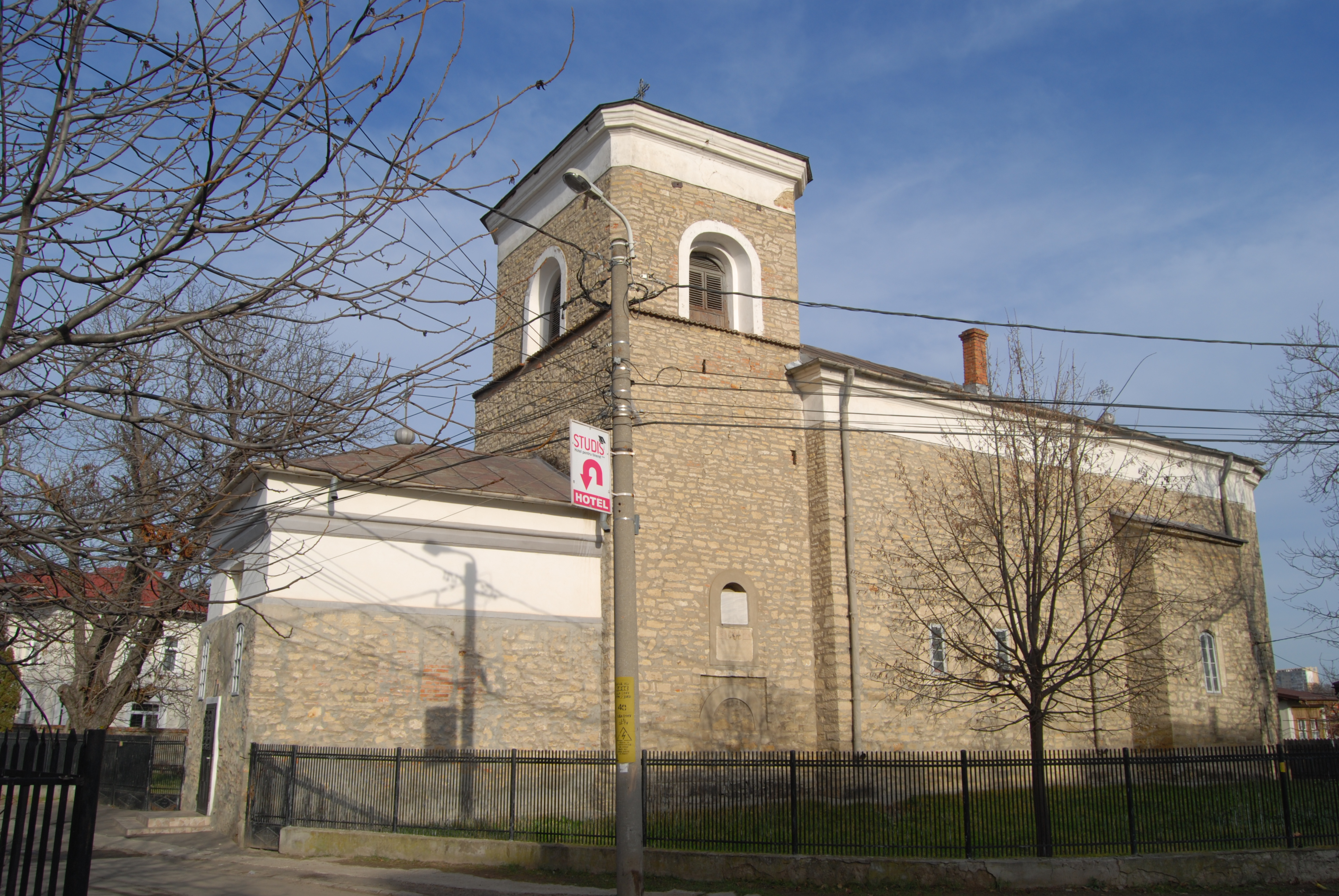
Zlataust Church

The Zlataust Church (Romanian: Biserica Zlataust) is a Romanian Orthodox church located at 5 Zlataust Road in Iași, Romania. It is dedicated to Saints John Chrysostom and Theodore of Amasea.

The first church on the site was a small wooden one with stone foundations, erected between 1563 and 1564. This was built by Prince Ștefan IX Tomșa, who in the early 17th century was preoccupied by the development of that part of the city, then on its periphery. Eventually, the old church deteriorated.

The present church dates to 1683, according to the inscription, and was built in thirty days by George Ducas, near the end of his third reign in Moldavia. In order to fulfill a promise, he put it under the control of church authorities from Argyrokastro in exchange for Hlincea Monastery, which he placed under Cetățuia Monastery, recently founded by him. An alternate date is late 1682: on April 20 the following year, he was obliged to accompany the Ottomans to the Battle of Vienna, and was taken prisoner by the Poles in December, while returning from the campaign. Oddly, the inscription mentions George's son Constantine, who was only 6 or 7 years old in 1682, as well as his wife Maria. His marriage took place only when he ascended the throne in 1693, implying that the plaque was placed at that point, when the church was already a decade old. The north wall of the old foyer features a painting of George holding the church, his wife Anastasia, their three daughters and their son. Inside the church, there is a list of names to be mentioned during the liturgy, beginning with Prince Eustratie Dabija and his wife.

The churchyard used to be Iași's main cemetery, and some of the gravestones remain in the yard and inside the church. In the foyer, added later, there is a stone for a vornic who died in 1858 and his family. Another family has a stone from 1877. The grave of musician Barbu Lăutaru was discovered during an excavation in 1968. The road on which the church is located is named after the latter. Writer Ionel Teodoreanu grew up in a house adjoining the church, and several of his writings deal with the vicinity. Notable architectural features include the church's stone walls and its tall bell tower, which has a hiding place for religious objects, to be used in cases of danger.

The church, which was enlarged in 1855, is listed as a historic monument by Romania's Ministry of Culture and Religious Affairs, together with Lăutaru's grave.

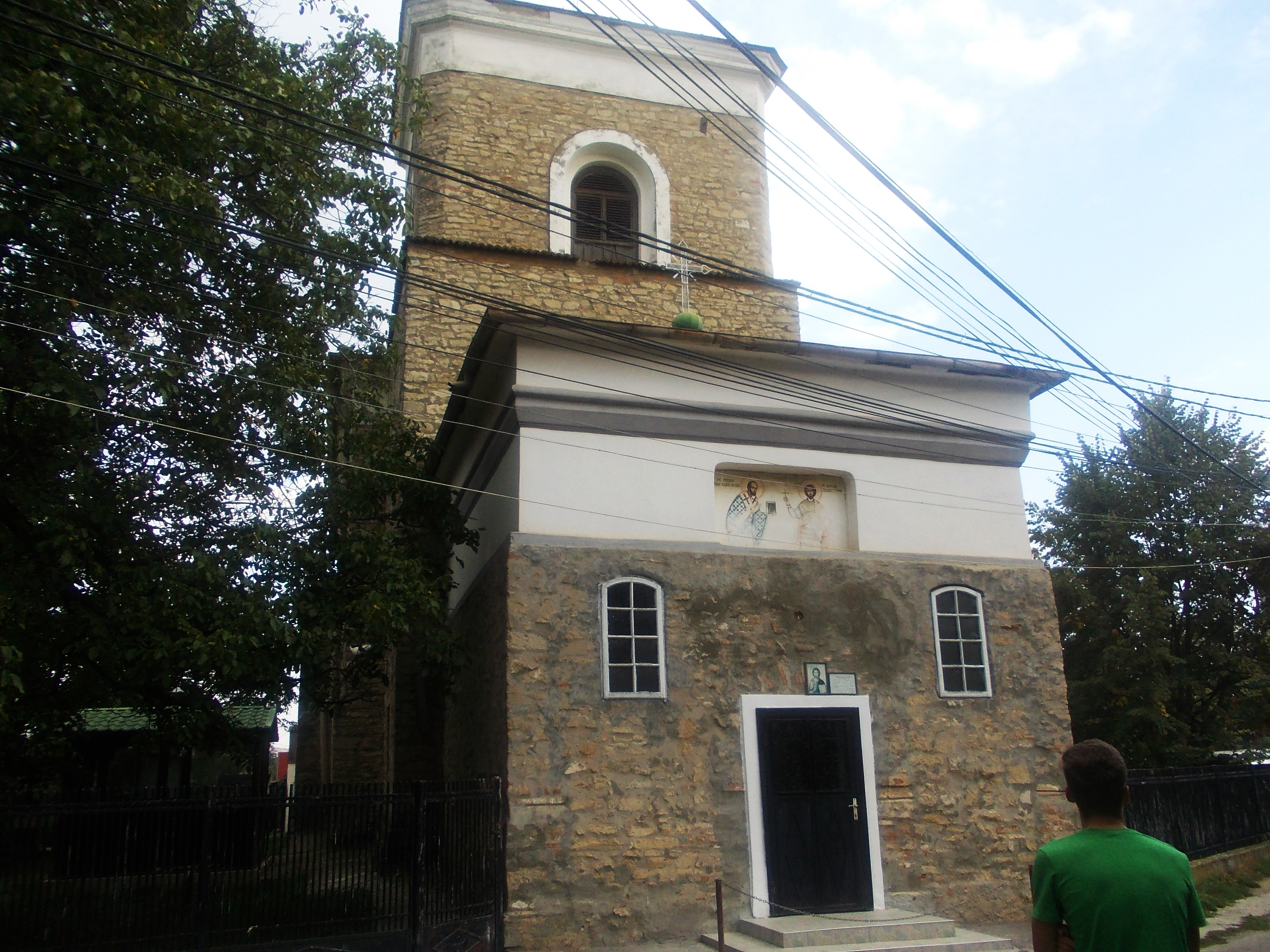
Entrance

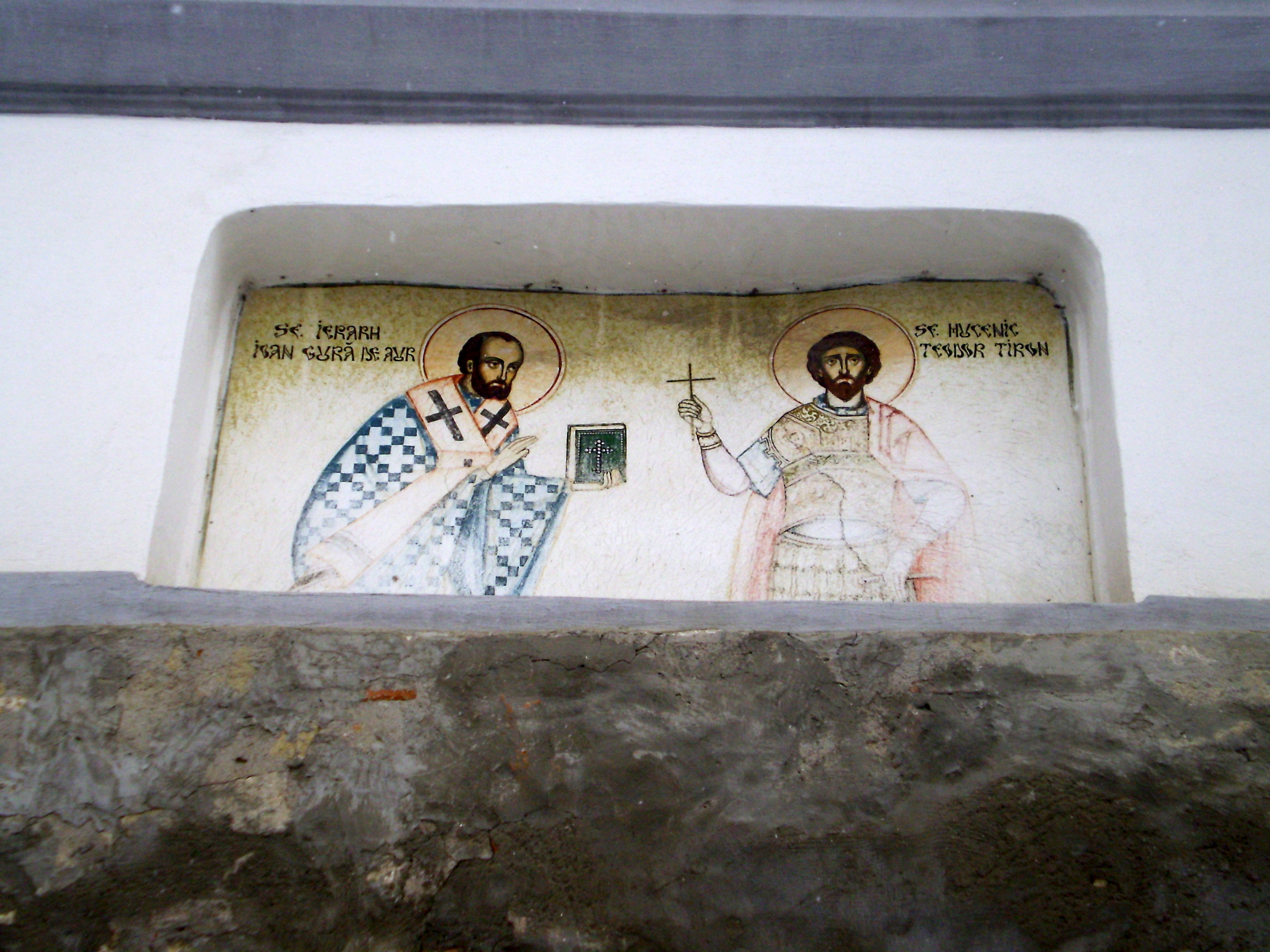
Ss. John Chrysostom and Theodore of Amasea

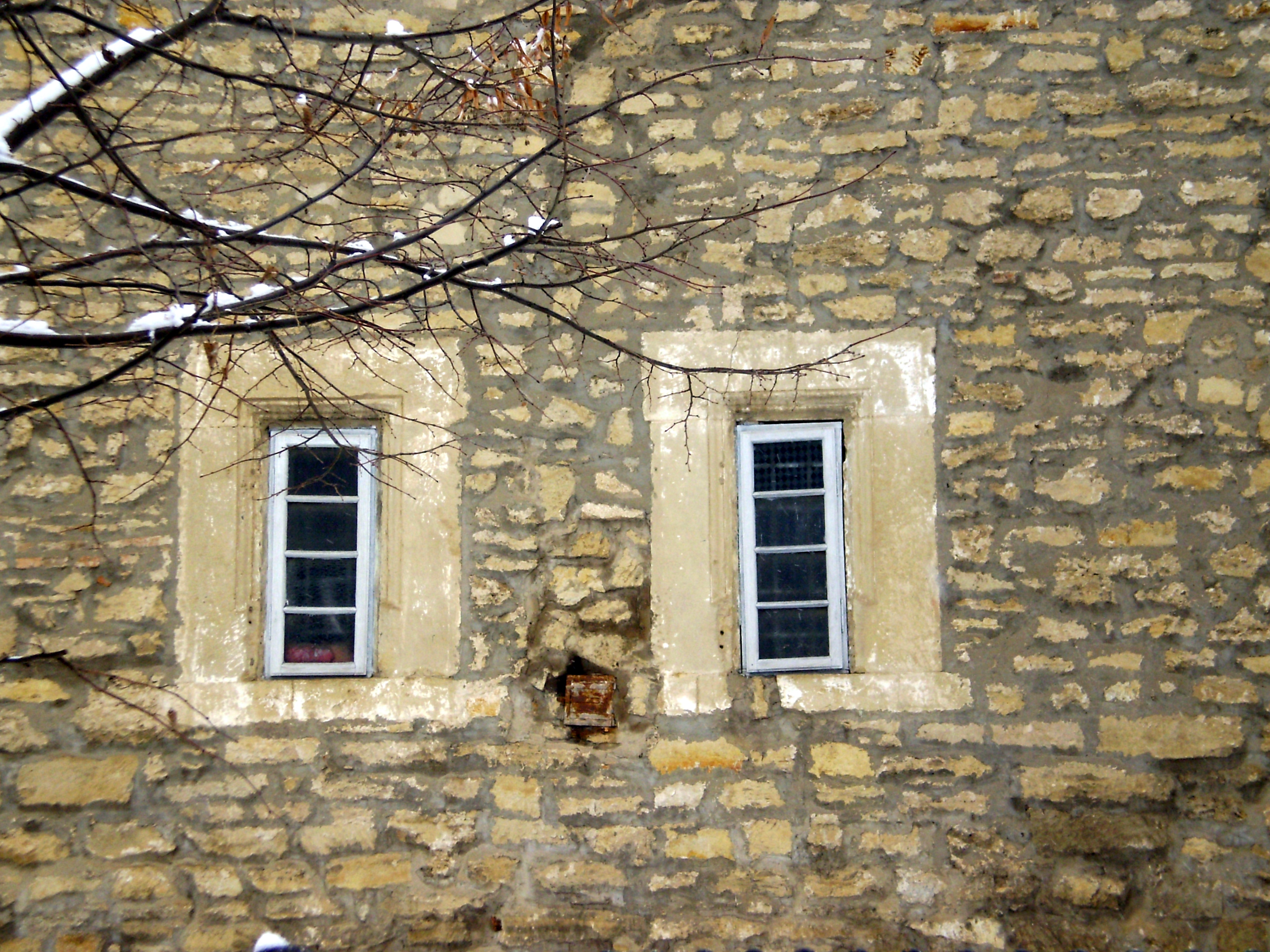
Detail
