= Three Holy Hierarchs Chapel =

Romanian Orthodox chapel

Coordinates: 47°12′03″N 27°32′29″E

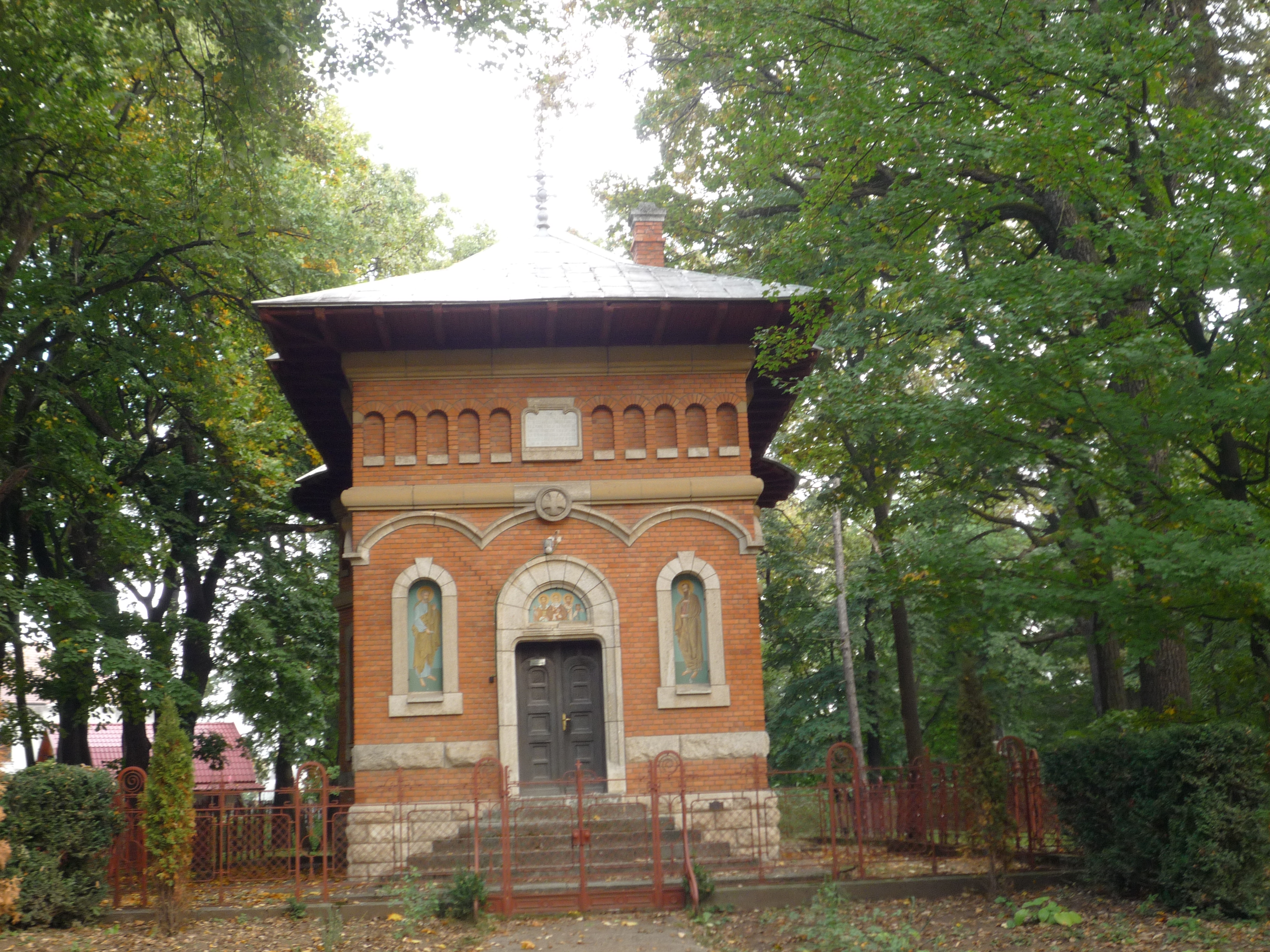
Three Holy Hierarchs Chapel

The Three Holy Hierarchs Chapel (Romanian: Capela Sfinții Trei Ierarhi) is a Romanian Orthodox chapel located at 46 Mihail Sadoveanu Alley in Iași, Romania. It is dedicated to the Three Holy Hierarchs.

A new building for the Vasile Lupu Normal School was erected in 1891. This was some 5 km from the city center and its churches, and it was felt that prayer space should exist closer by. Thus, the chapel was built for the students between 1907 and 1911, funded through the state institution Casa Bisericii. The architects also took care of the painting and decoration. The chapel's dedication reflects the fact that the beginning of education in Moldavia was linked to Trei Ierarhi Monastery. The chapel was blessed by Pimen Georgescu, Metropolitan of Moldavia. It was used by the students until 1947 and the establishment of a communist regime. It was then closed down until 1990 when, in the aftermath of the Romanian Revolution, it reopened for services. Since 1995, it serves as a chapel for students from the theological seminary that now occupies the normal school building. At the same time, it is open to normal school students.

The chapel is made of stone and brick, with the two materials alternating on the exterior. The western wall features three painted wooden portraits of the Holy Hierarchs above the entrance, and Saints Peter and Paul on the sides. The dedication plaque is of white marble, dating the construction to 1910. The apses are three-sided on the exterior and semicircular in the interior. The vestibule has a space for the choir, and features portraits of King Carol I and Queen Elisabeth in their role of ktitors. The interior is entirely painted in fresco. The iconostasis is elaborately carved, while the roof is simple. There is no spire, only five large metal crosses on the roof. Repairs were carried out during the 1990s.

The chapel is listed as a historic monument by Romania's Ministry of Culture and Religious Affairs.

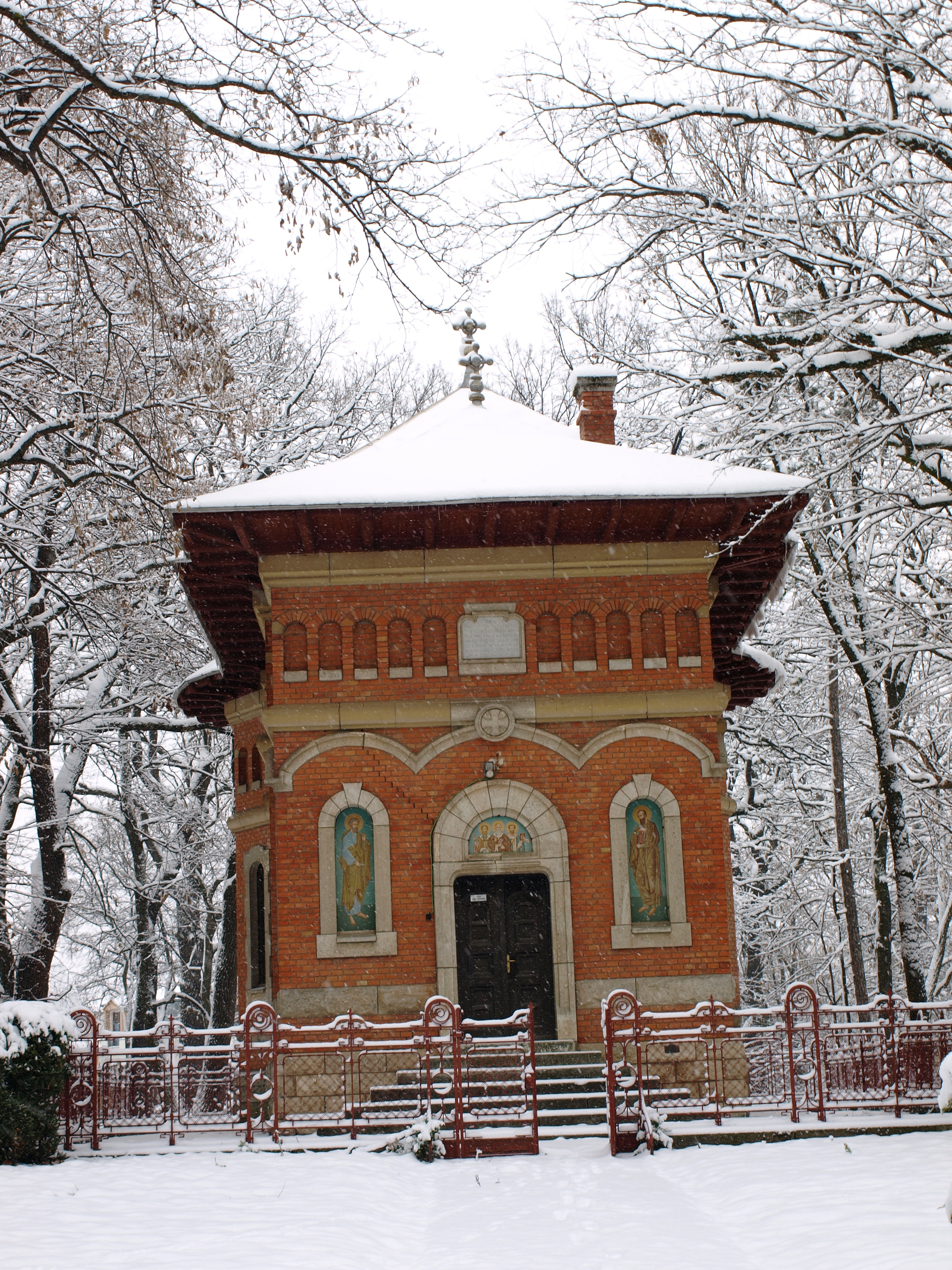
In winter

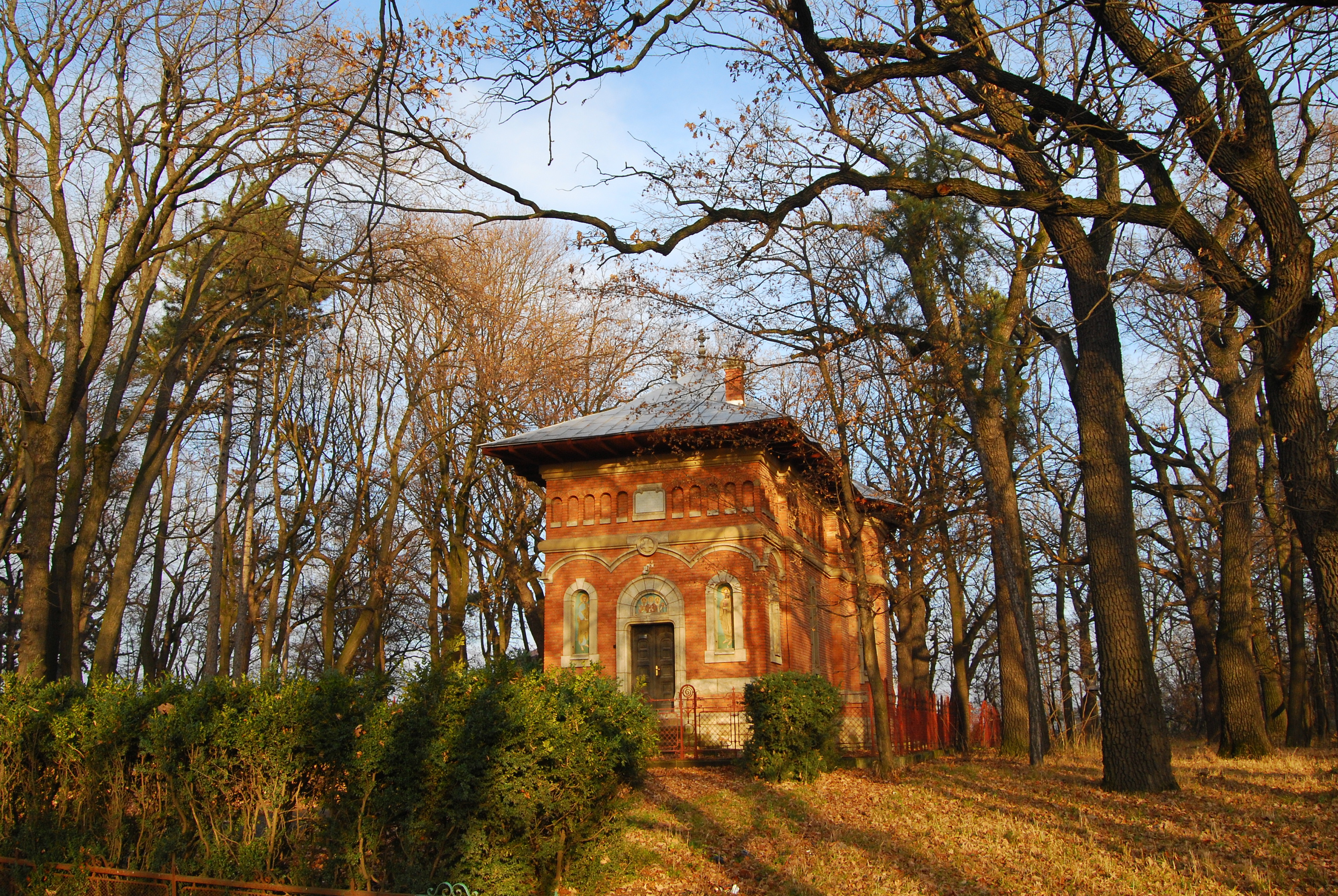
Setting
