= Curelari Church =

Heritage site in Iași County, Romania

Coordinates: 47.1665°N 27.5908°E

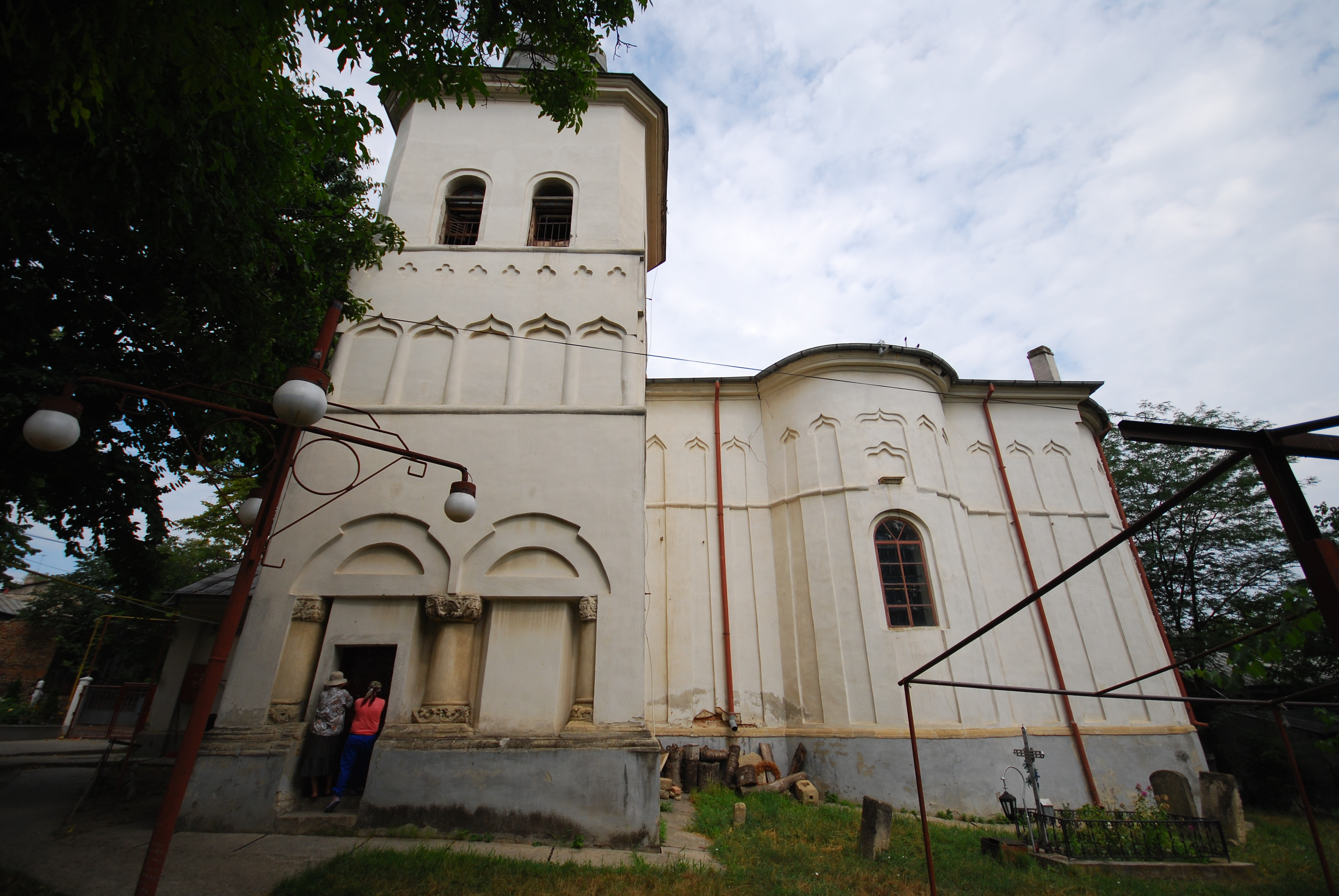
Curelari Church

The Curelari Church (Romanian: Biserica Curelari) is a Romanian Orthodox church located at 2 Curelari Street in Iași, Romania. It is dedicated to Pentecost.

The church is first mentioned in a document of 1663, and again in 1682. It was founded by two guilds, for belt makers (curelari) and boot makers, who formed most of the parishioners. Its original appearance has not been preserved, and the present church owes its form to repairs carried out in 1761. At that point, the foyer was added (initially open, later closed) with the bell tower above it. Consular reports indicate that Janissaries burned the church in 1822. The interior was restored in 1875. Similar to other churches built by their parishioners, there is no dedicatory plaque.

At one time, the church was probably surrounded by a river stone wall, of which vestiges can be seen to the south, beyond the parish house. A gate also survives there; this was used by girls coming to church from a nearby school. Old, half-buried gravestones for guild members, with Greek and Slavonic inscriptions, are left over from the defunct cemetery in the churchyard. New construction covers parts of what presumably was once a much larger plot.

The church is listed as a historic monument by Romania's Ministry of Culture and Religious Affairs.

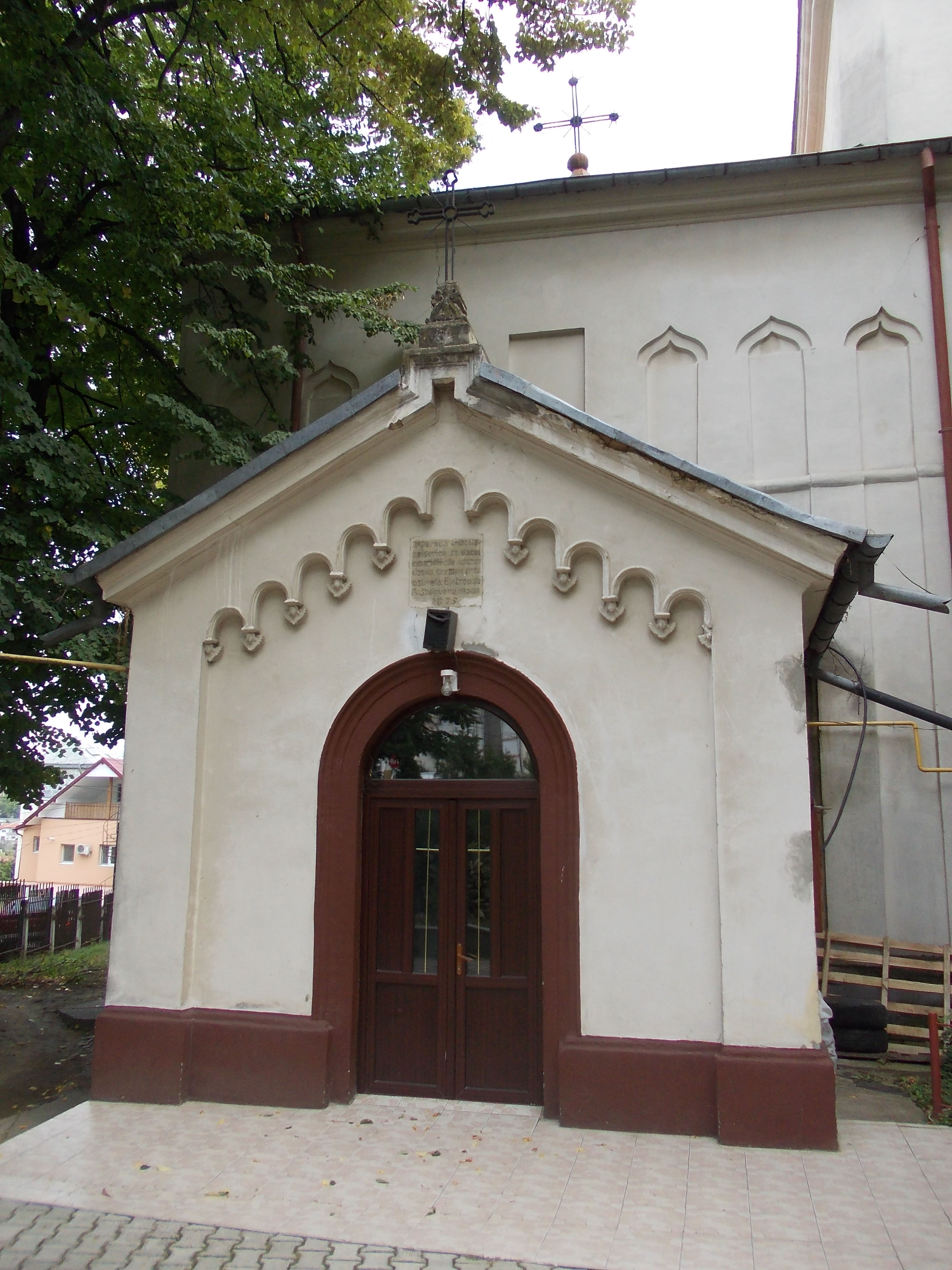
Entrance

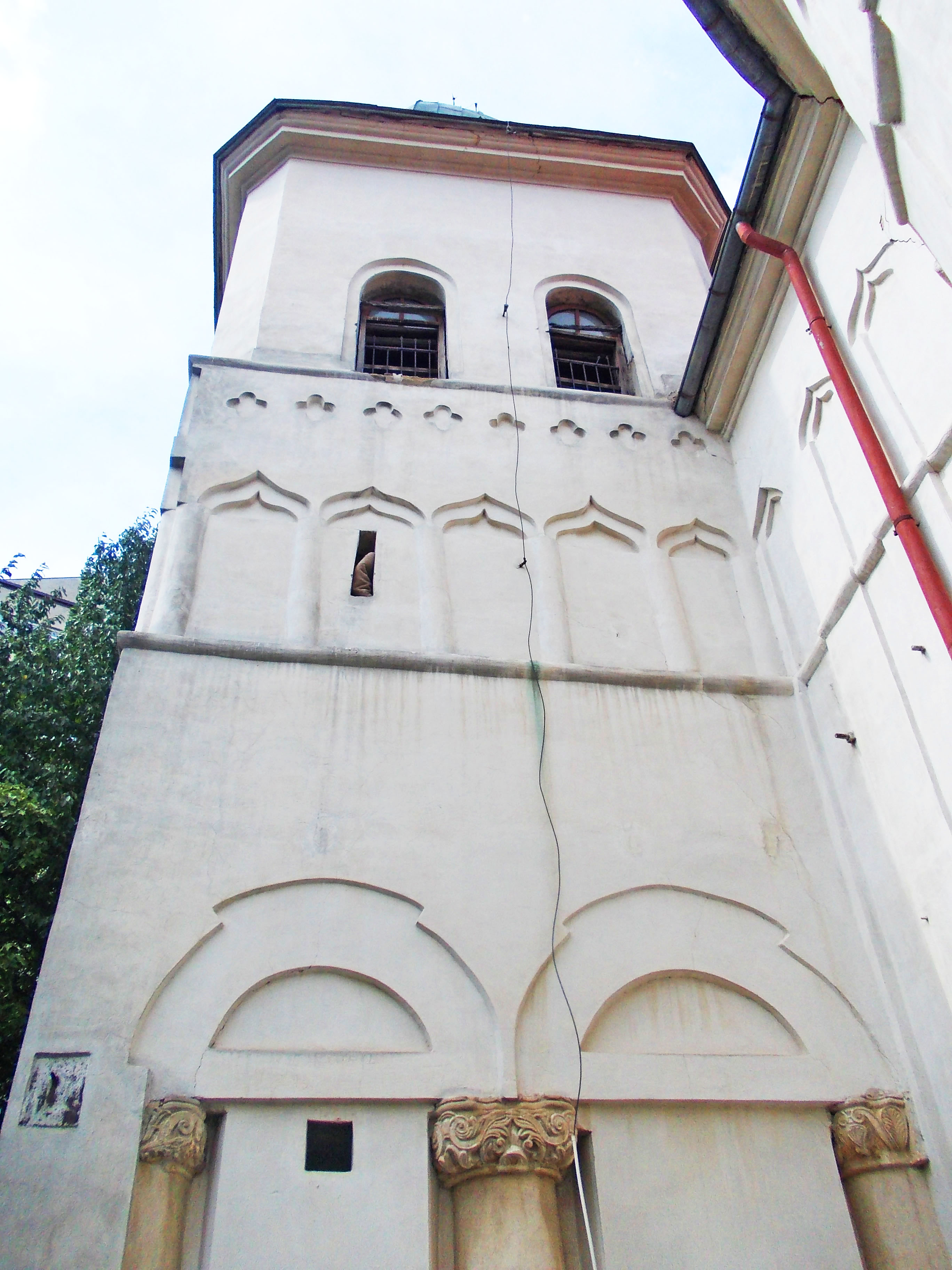
Spire

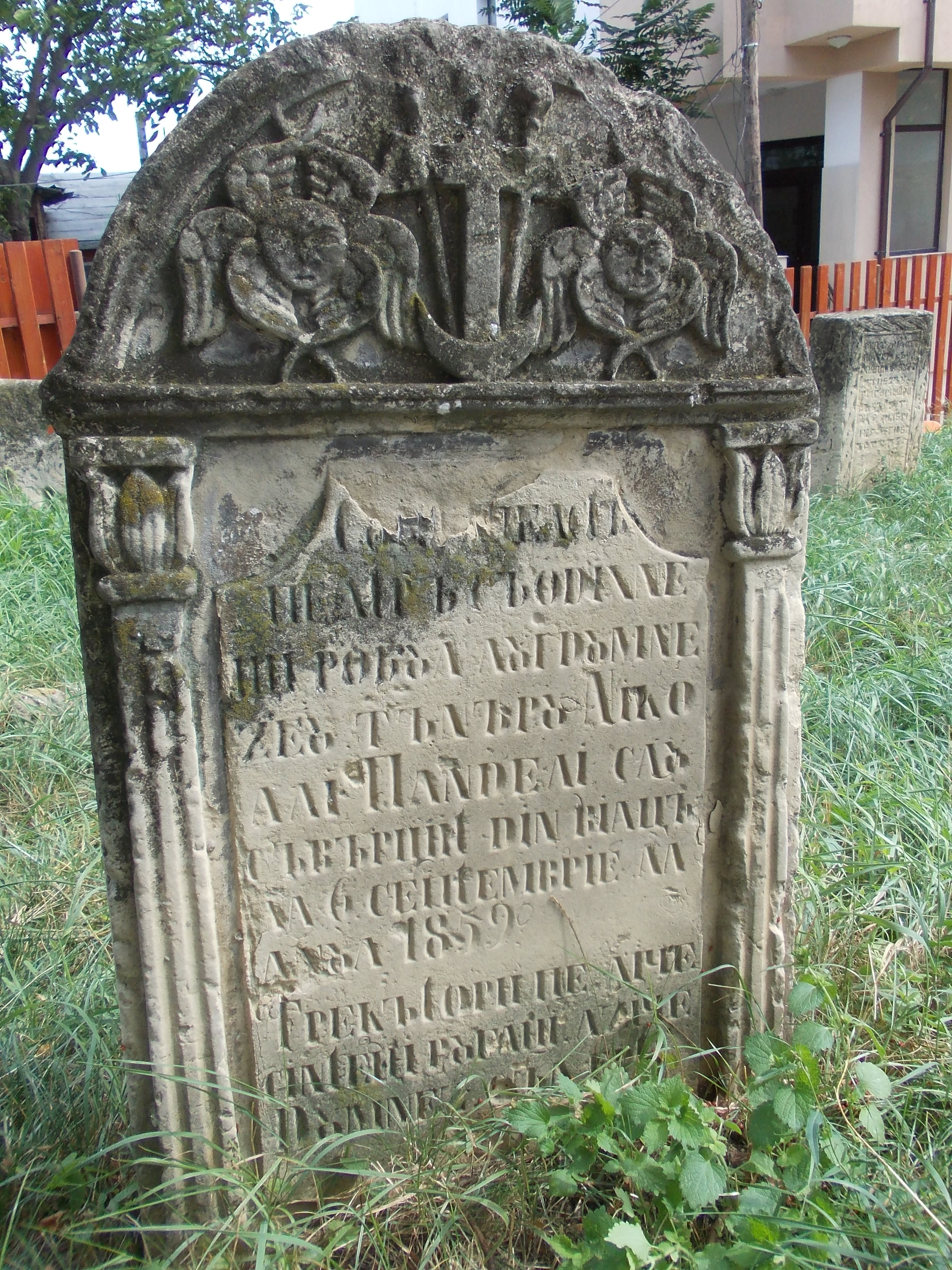
Headstone

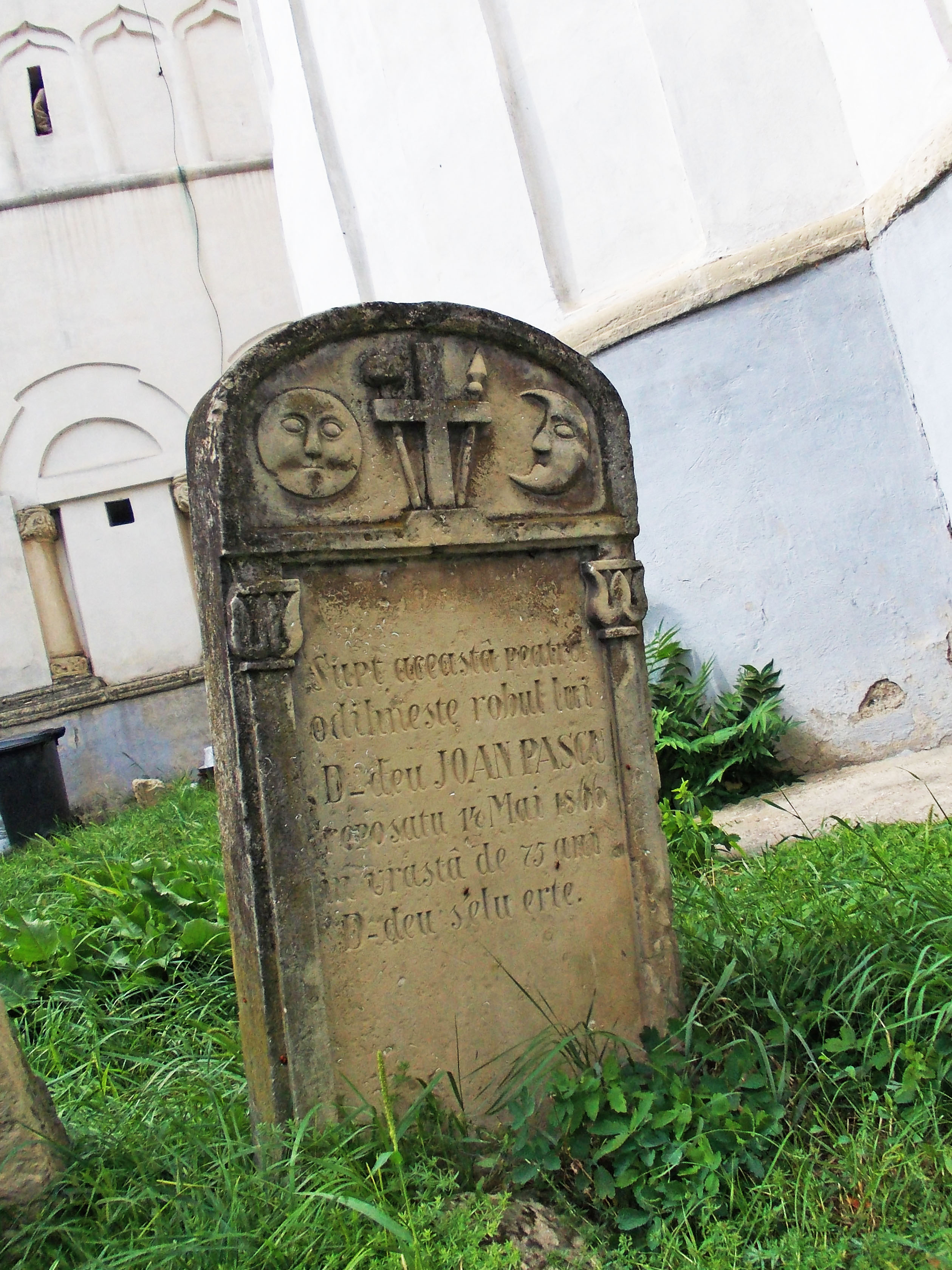
Headstone

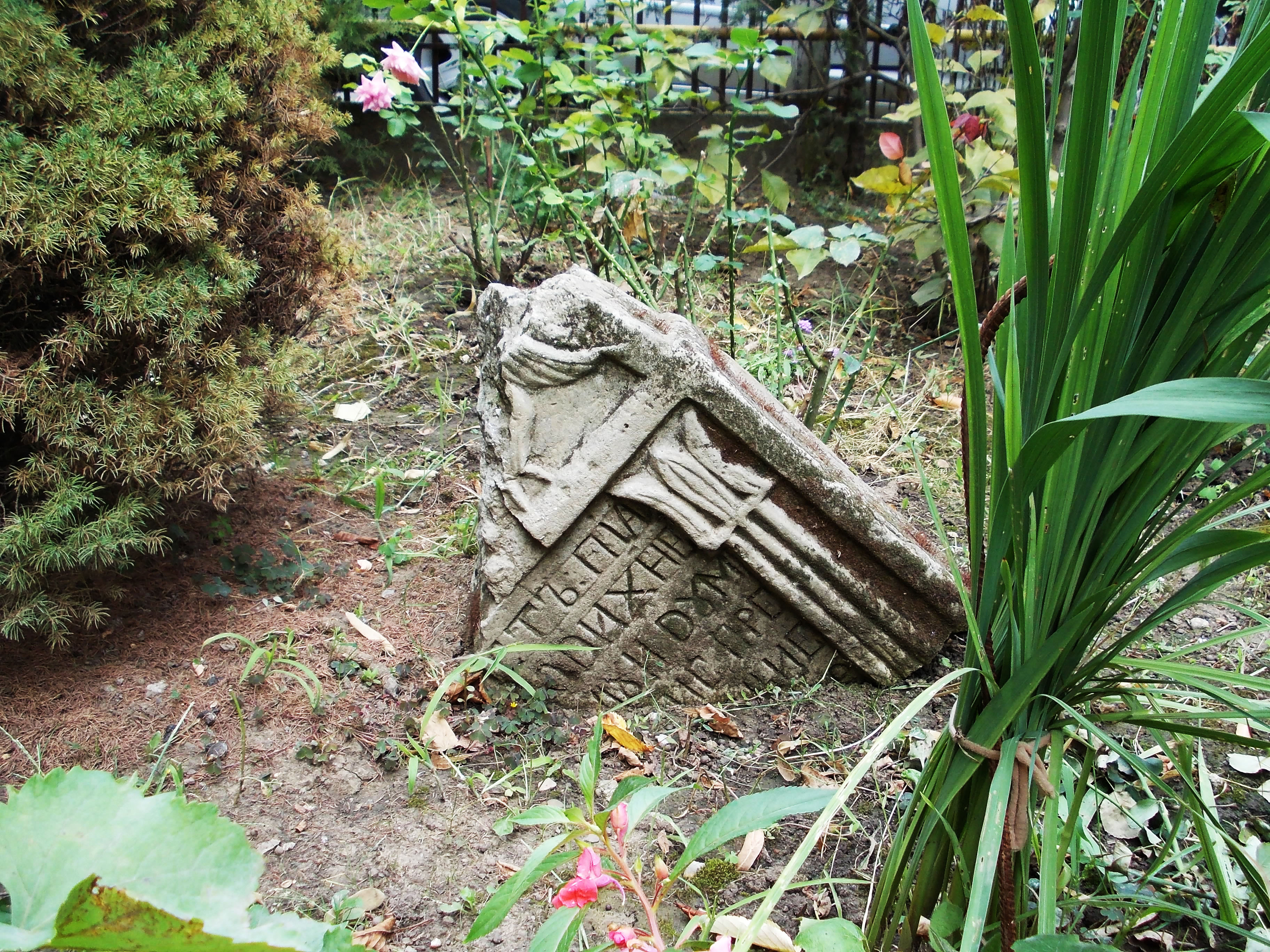
Headstone
