= Holy Trinity Church, Iași =

Heritage site in Iași County, Romania

Coordinates: 47.1738°N 27.5508°E

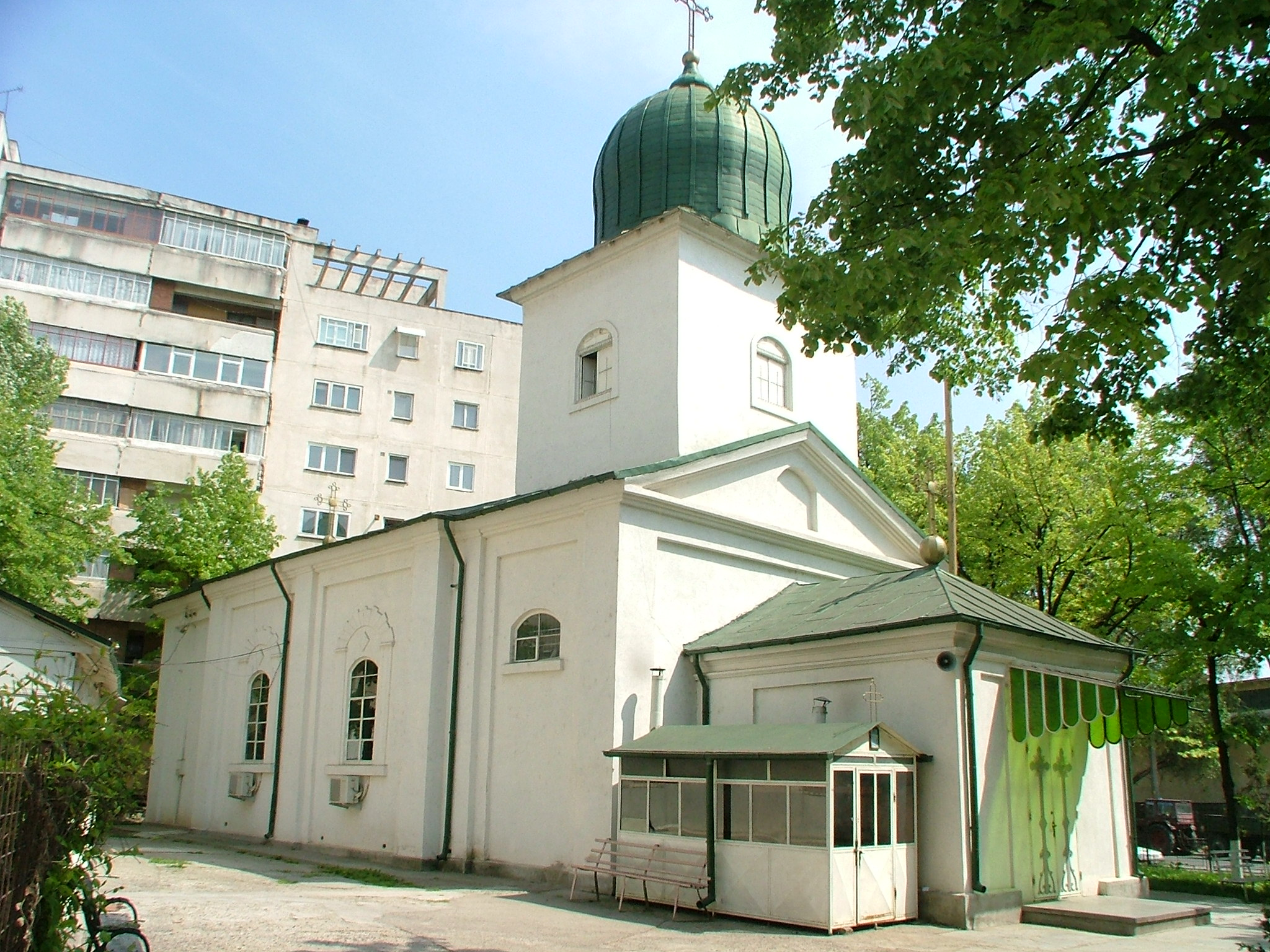
Holy Trinity Church

Holy Trinity Church (Romanian: Biserica Sfânta Treime) is a Romanian Orthodox church located at 2 Canta Street in Iași, Romania. It is dedicated to the Holy Trinity.

The church was built between 1844 and 1853, and was blessed in 1853. A certain Iancu Sevastopou had the initiative of building the church, and the land was granted upon his request by the archimandrite of Trei Ierarhi Monastery in 1844. Construction lasted nine years because it was funded solely out of contributions from the laity. The church was painted in a neo-Byzantine style in 1958. Repairs were carried out beginning in 2003.

The church is listed as a historic monument by Romania's Ministry of Culture and Religious Affairs.
