= Chapel of Saint Petka, Belgrade =

Coordinates: 44°49′33″N 20°27′04″E

Chapel of Saint Petka
- Капела Свете Петке
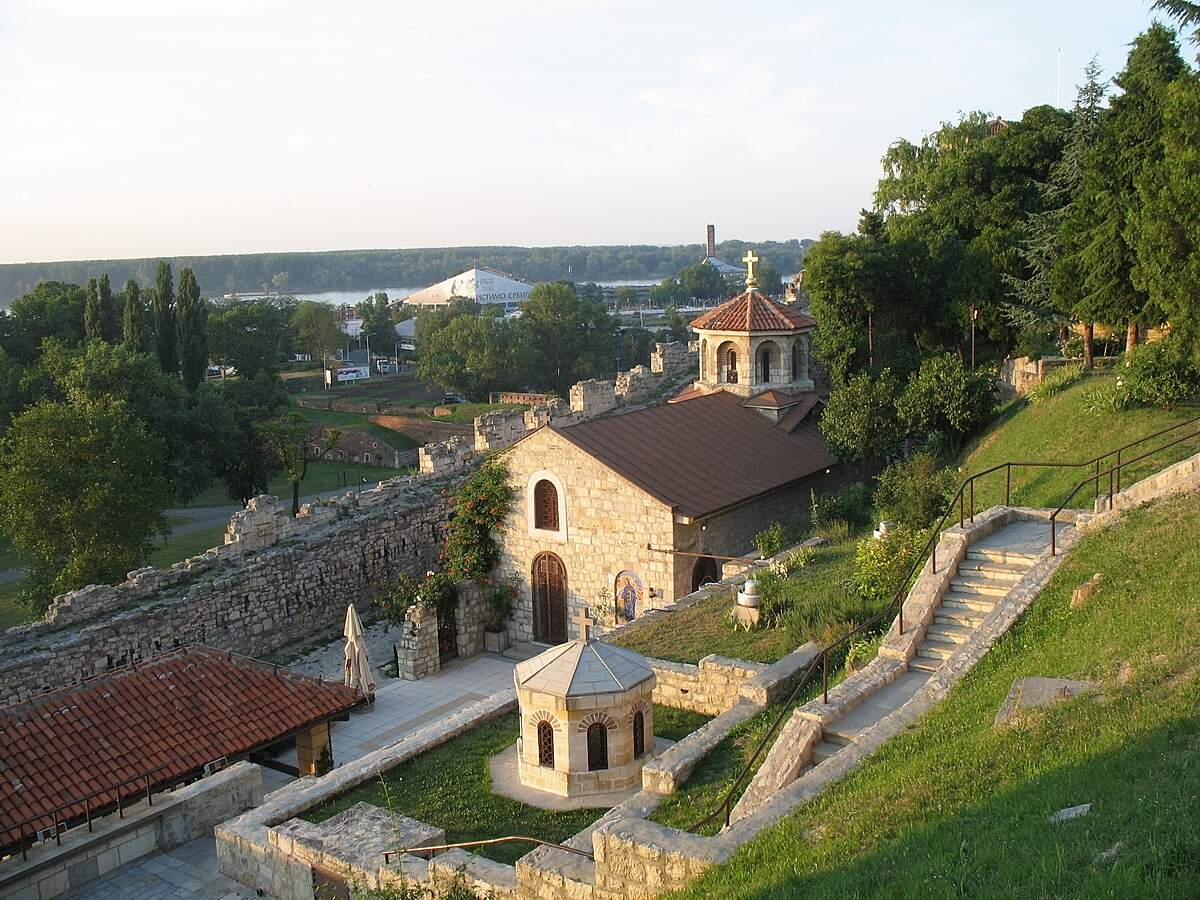
- The chapel tower as seen in 2023
- Chapel of Saint Petka
- Location: Belgrade
- Country: Serbia
- Denomination: Serbian Orthodox Church

History
- Founded: 1937

The Chapel of Saint Petka (Serbian: Капела Свете Петке, Kapela Svete Petke) in Belgrade is a chapel, erected over a sacred spring, and dedicated to Saint Petka. It is located at a way connecting the upper and the lower city of the Belgrade Fortress, in proximity of the Ružica Church, with the spring being in the very altar of the chapel. The present-day chapel was built in 1937 after a project of the architect Momir Korunović. Its inner walls and vaults are covered by mosaics done by painter Đuro Radlović in 1980–1983.

== History ==
A chapel of Saint Petka in Belgrade was built in 1417 by an unknown dignitary when her relics were translated to Belgrade at the request of Princess Milica of Serbia to the sultan. The exact location of this chapel is not known, nor whether it was erected near the sacred spring. After Belgrade was captured in 1521, the relics were translated to Constantinople and in 1641 to Iași. The current chapel contains a piece of the relics.

Prior to today's chapel, a dugout chapel existed on the slope, decorated with icons and containing the sacred spring. Since it was in bad condition, after an initiative by Patriarch Varnava, the today's chapel was built and consecrated at Saint Petka's feast day in 1937. Digging the foundation uncovered remains of an older temple, and bones of soldiers who were killed in the defence of Belgrade in 1914 and 1915, that were transferred into a nearby ossuary. Also found were Turkish tombstones, including that of vizier Marashli Ali Pasha.

The chapel complex also includes a baptismal font and the parish home.

== Chapel painting ==
The chapel was painted twice. The first paintings were done by an academician-painter Vladimir Predojević. The paintings soon deteriorated because of the poor quality of materials used for the works, and so the second paintings were done as a mosaic. The second paintings were done by Belgrade painter Đuro Radlović between 1975 and 1982, and consecrated by Patriarch German on February 27, 1983.

== Friday prayers ==
The chapel can be visited every day, but is most often visited on Friday and slava days, especially at Saint Petka's feast day on October 27. Every Friday morning a liturgy with reading of the canon of Saint Petka and kissing her holy relics is held in Ružica Church, while in the afternoon it is held in the chapel of Saint Petka.

The existence of the sacred spring is first mentioned in 1658 by Michel Quiclet. It has dried up once, after the withdrawal of the Serbian army from Serbia in 1915, but ran again in 1918 on the feast day of Saint Onesimus, so on this day a liturgy is being held in the chapel and the water is consecrated.

== Gallery ==
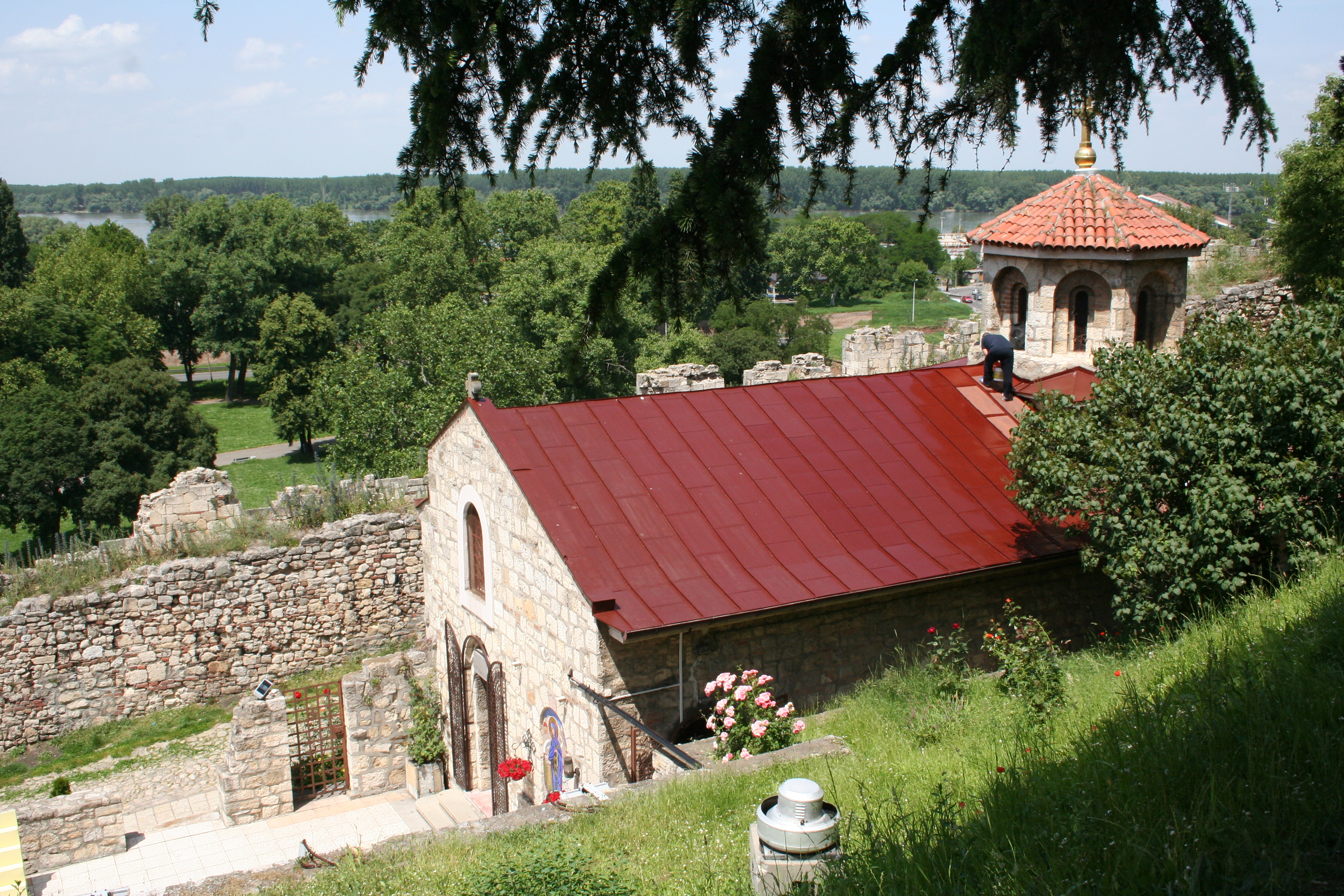

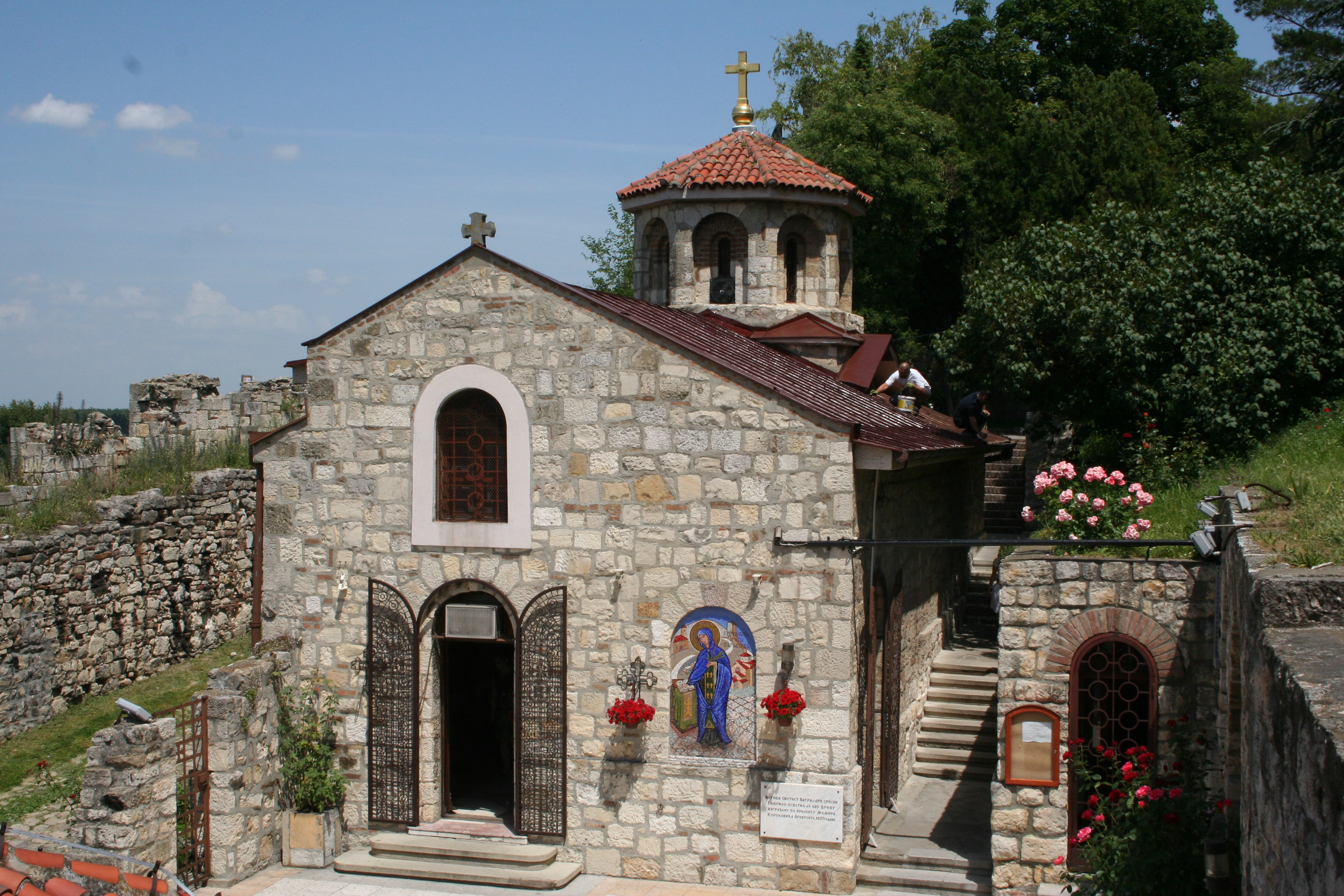

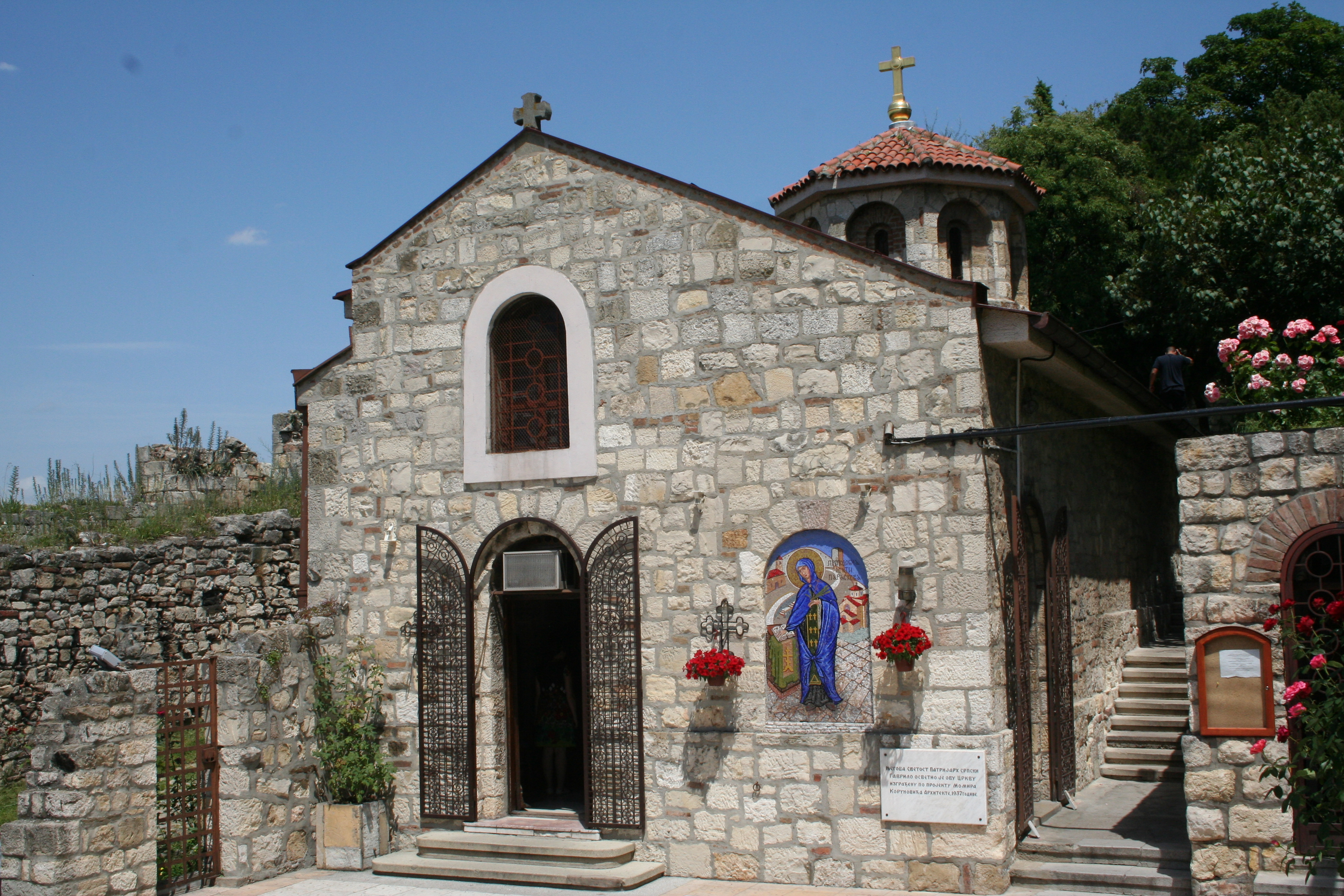

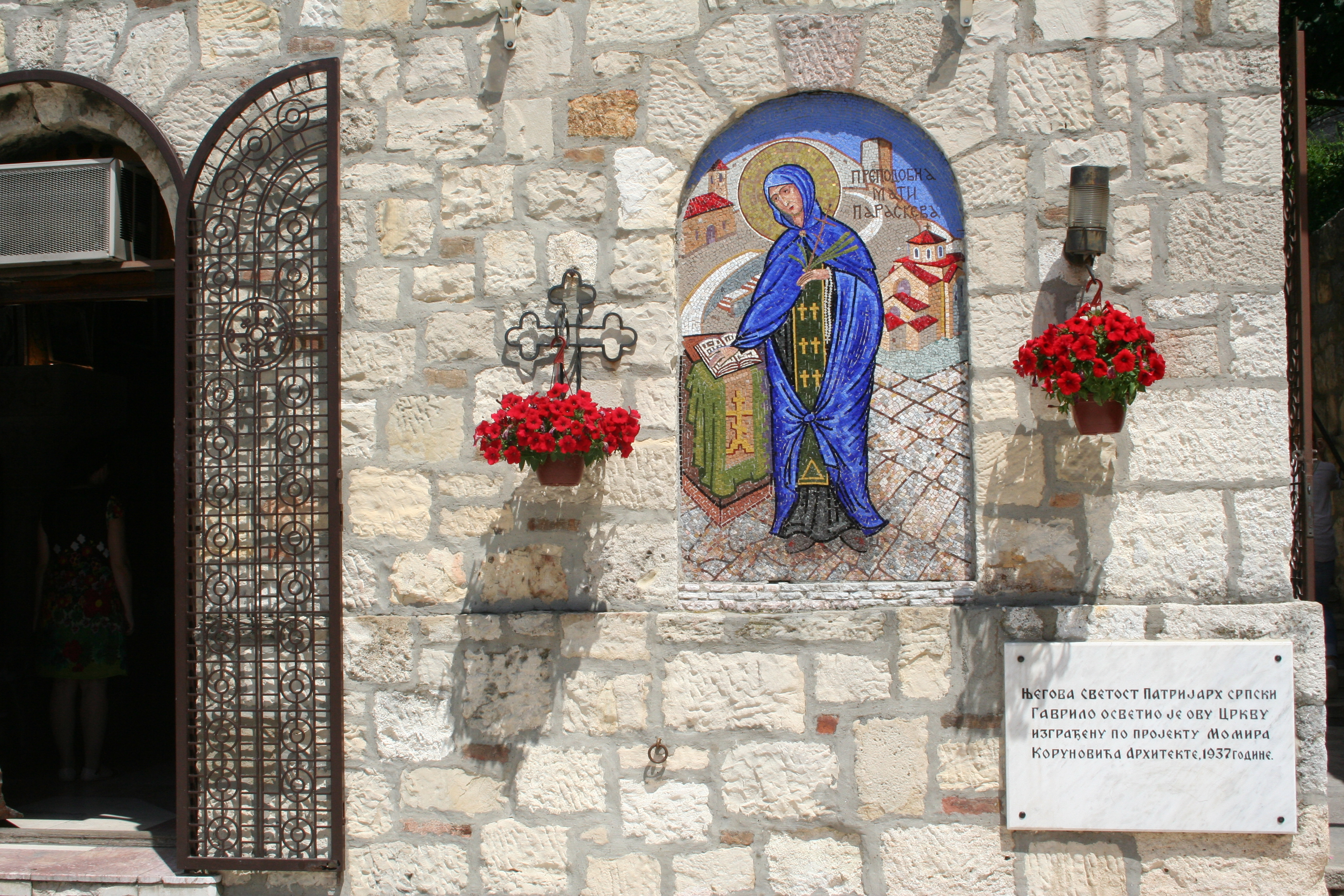
Icon of Saint Petka on the church wall

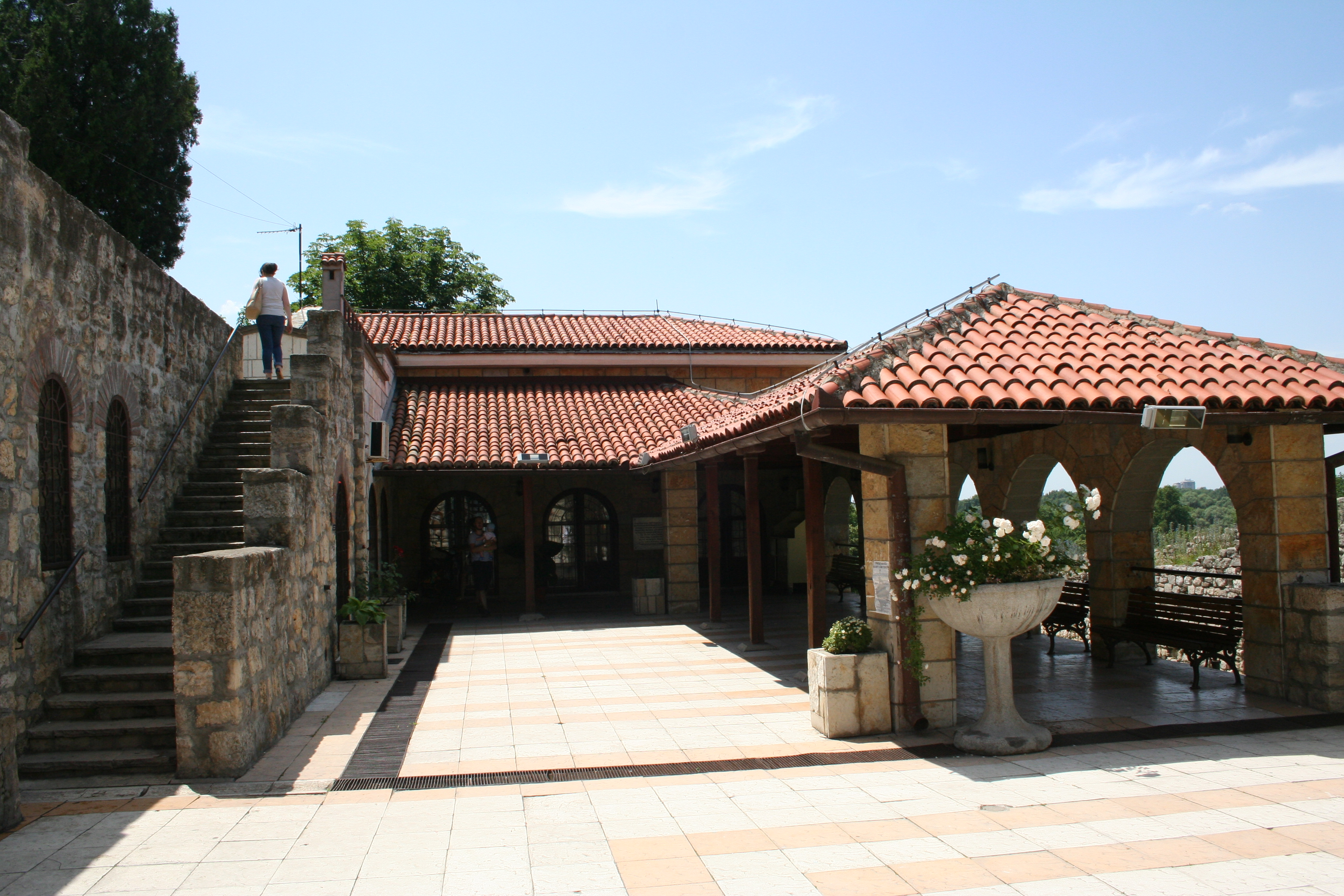
Parish building

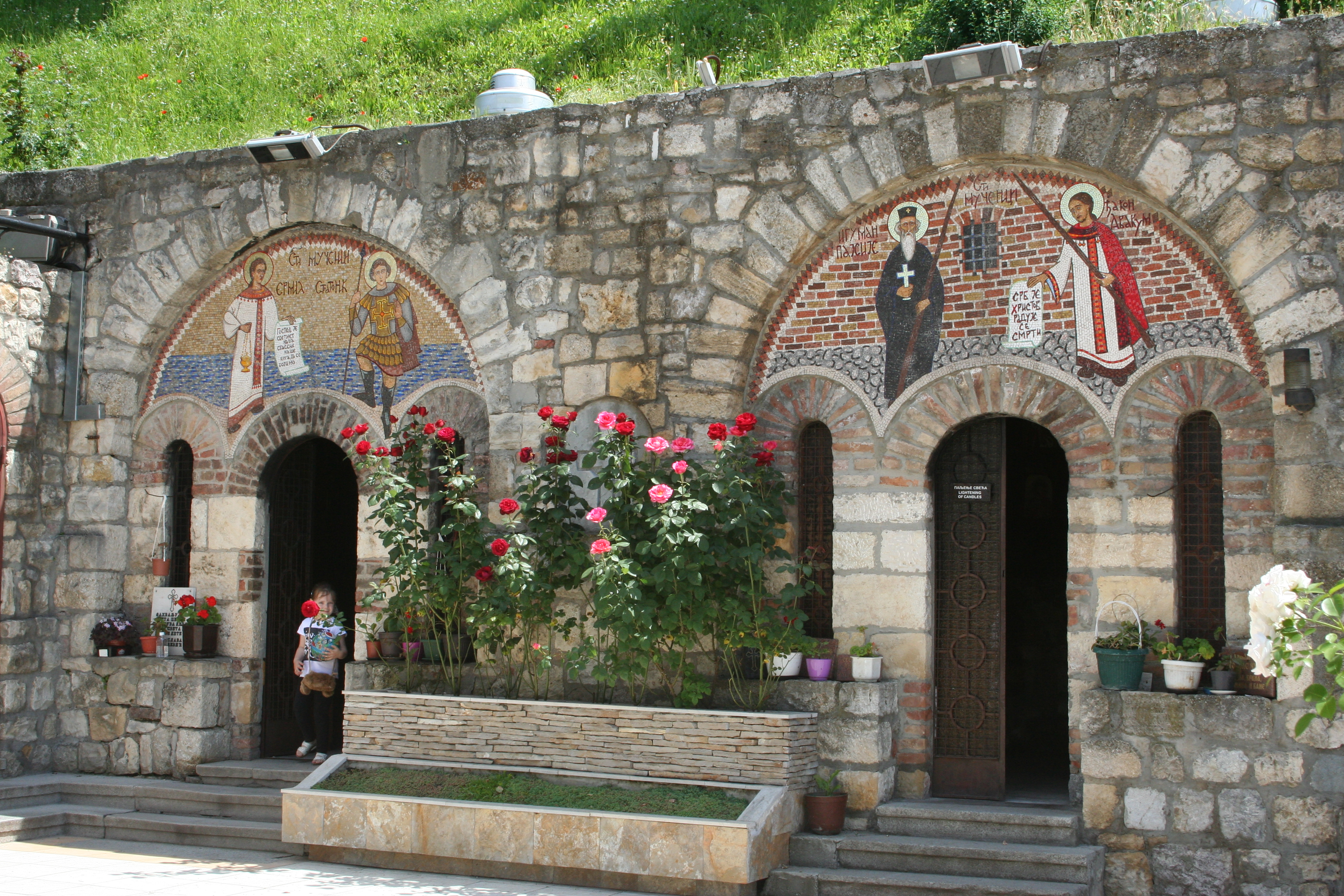
Candle alcoves

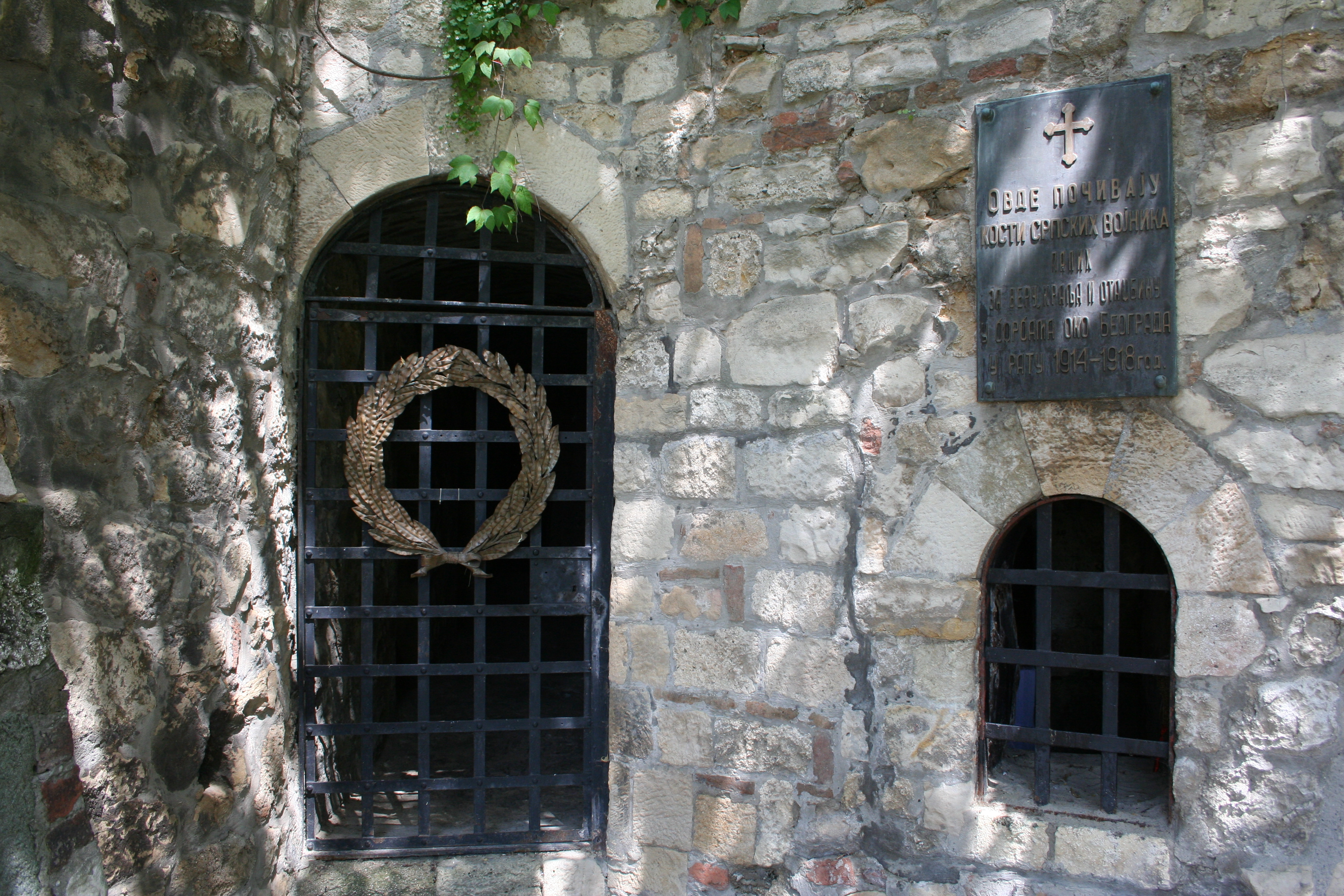
Memorial Ossuary for the 1914–15 defenders of Belgrade, in the fortress wall behind the chapel

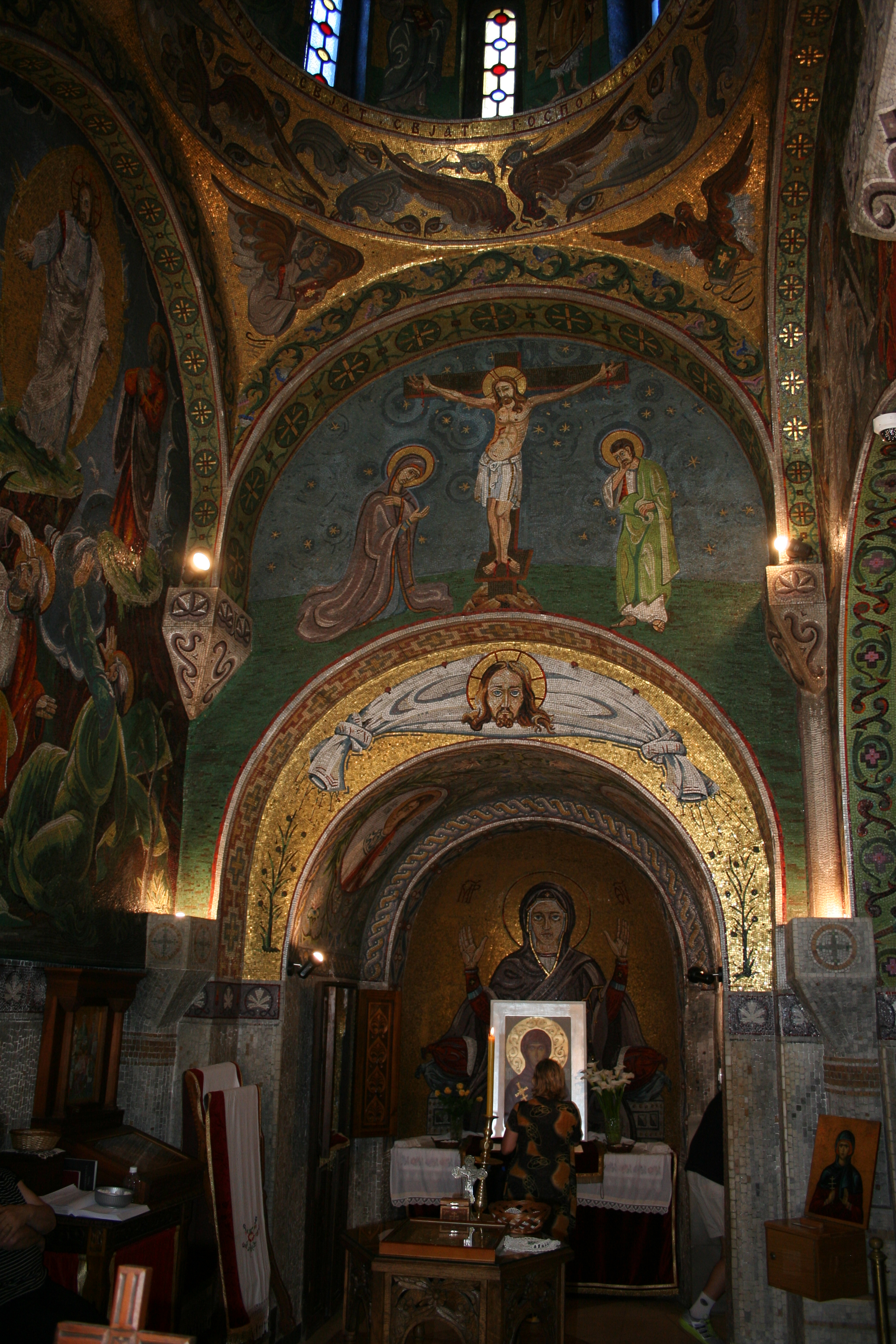
Inside of the chapel

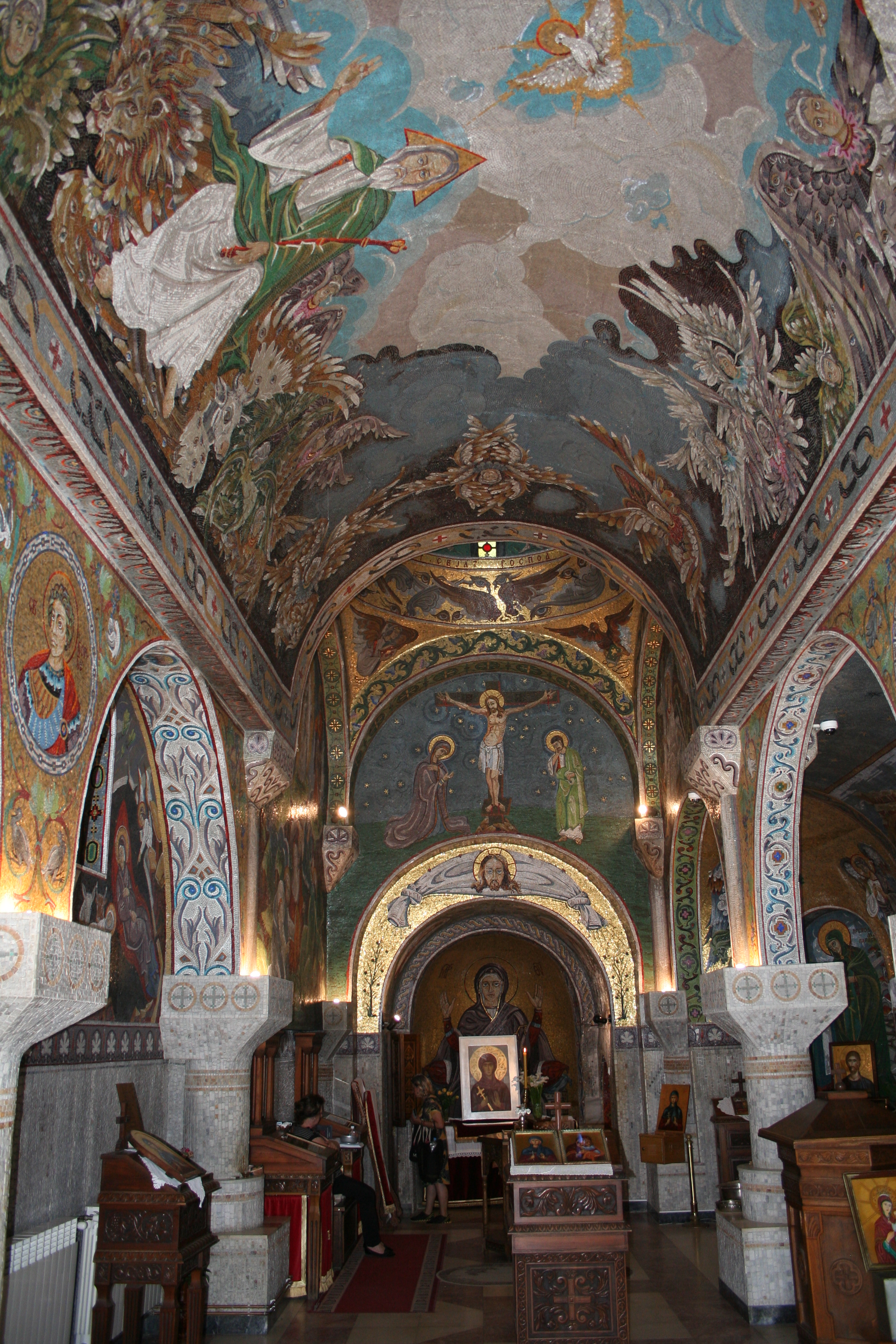
Inside of the chapel

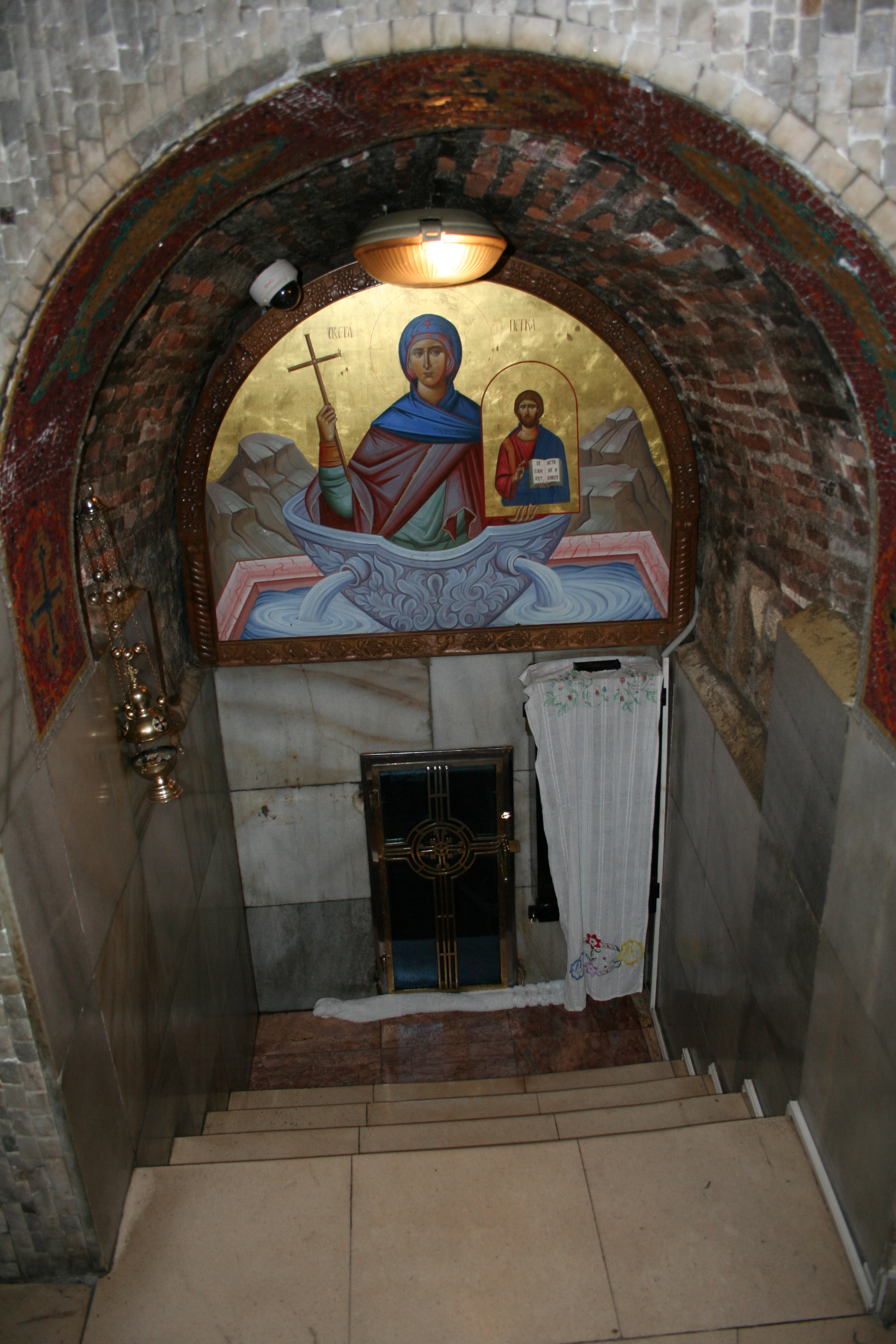
The spring of Saint Petka in the chapel

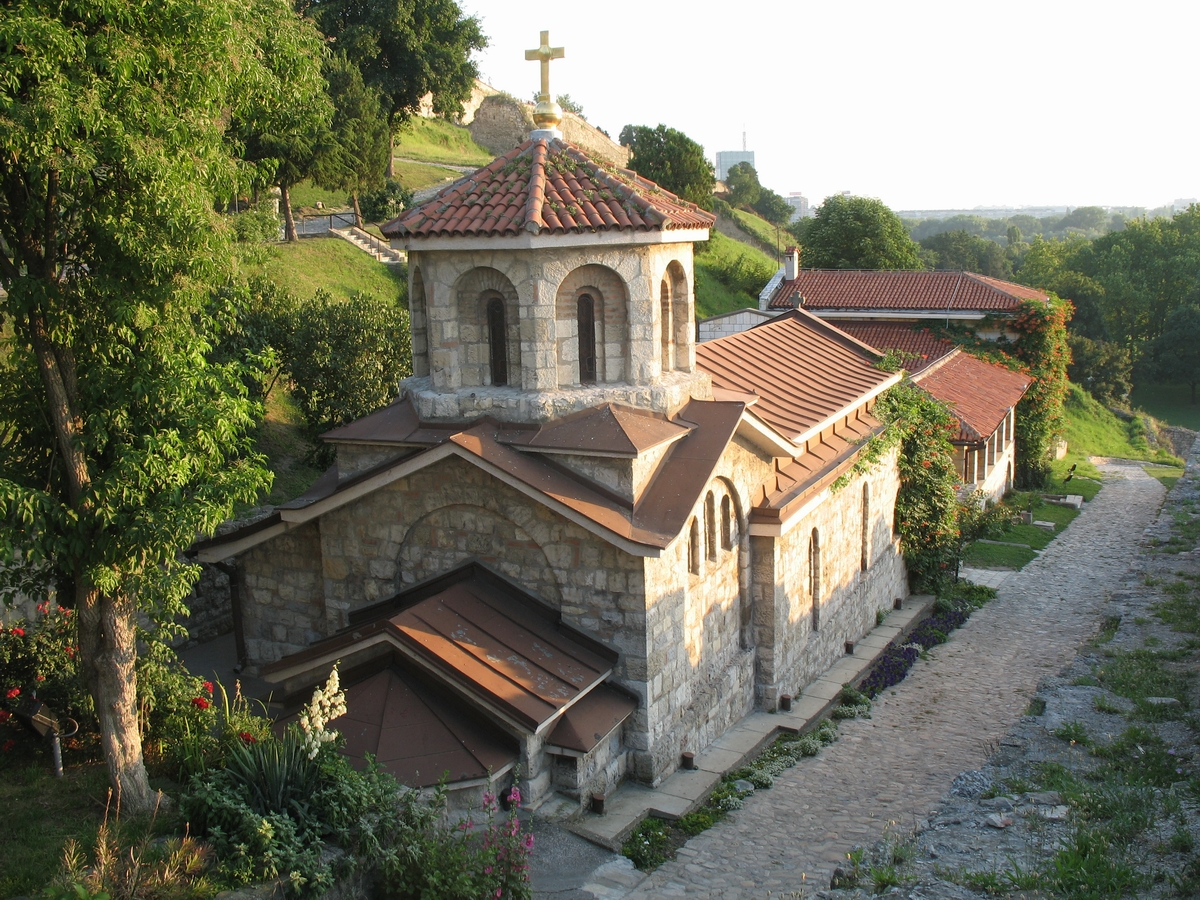

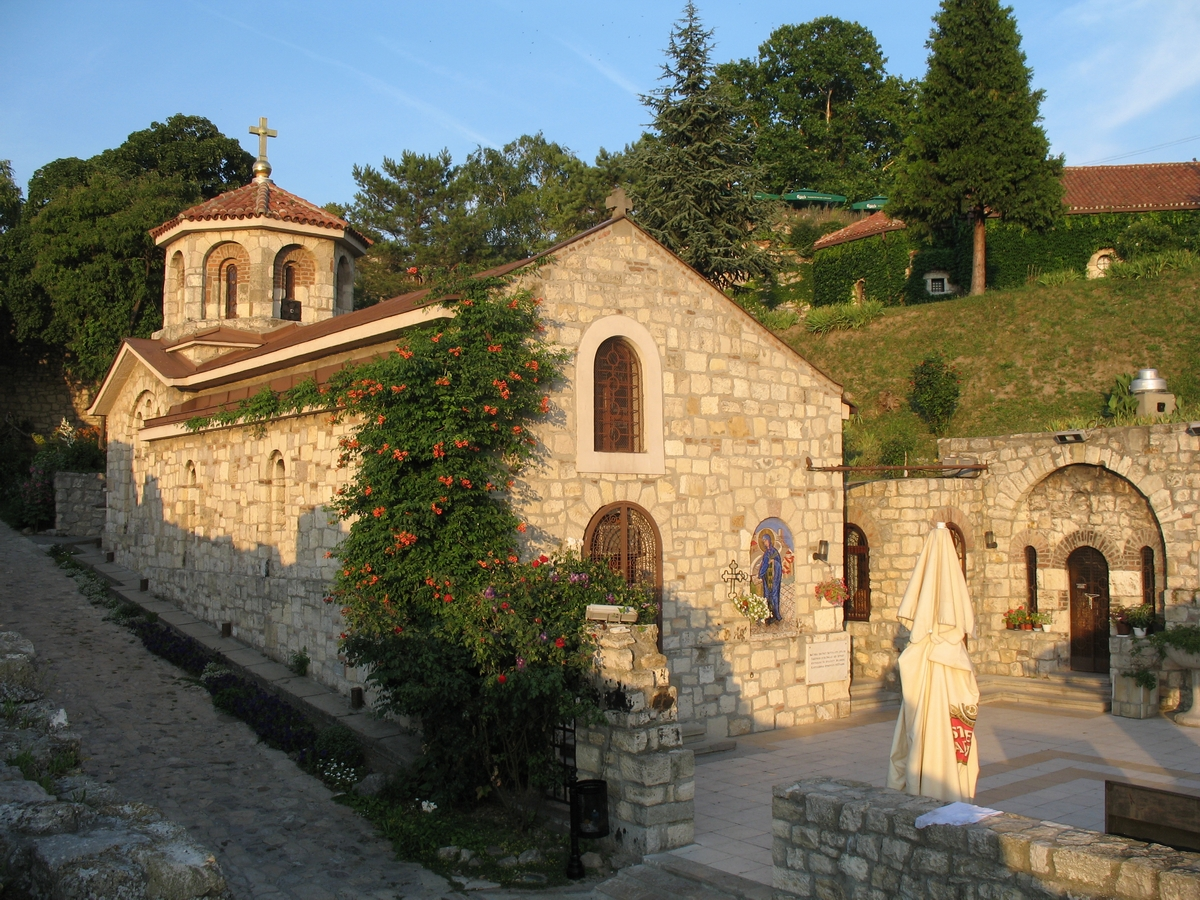

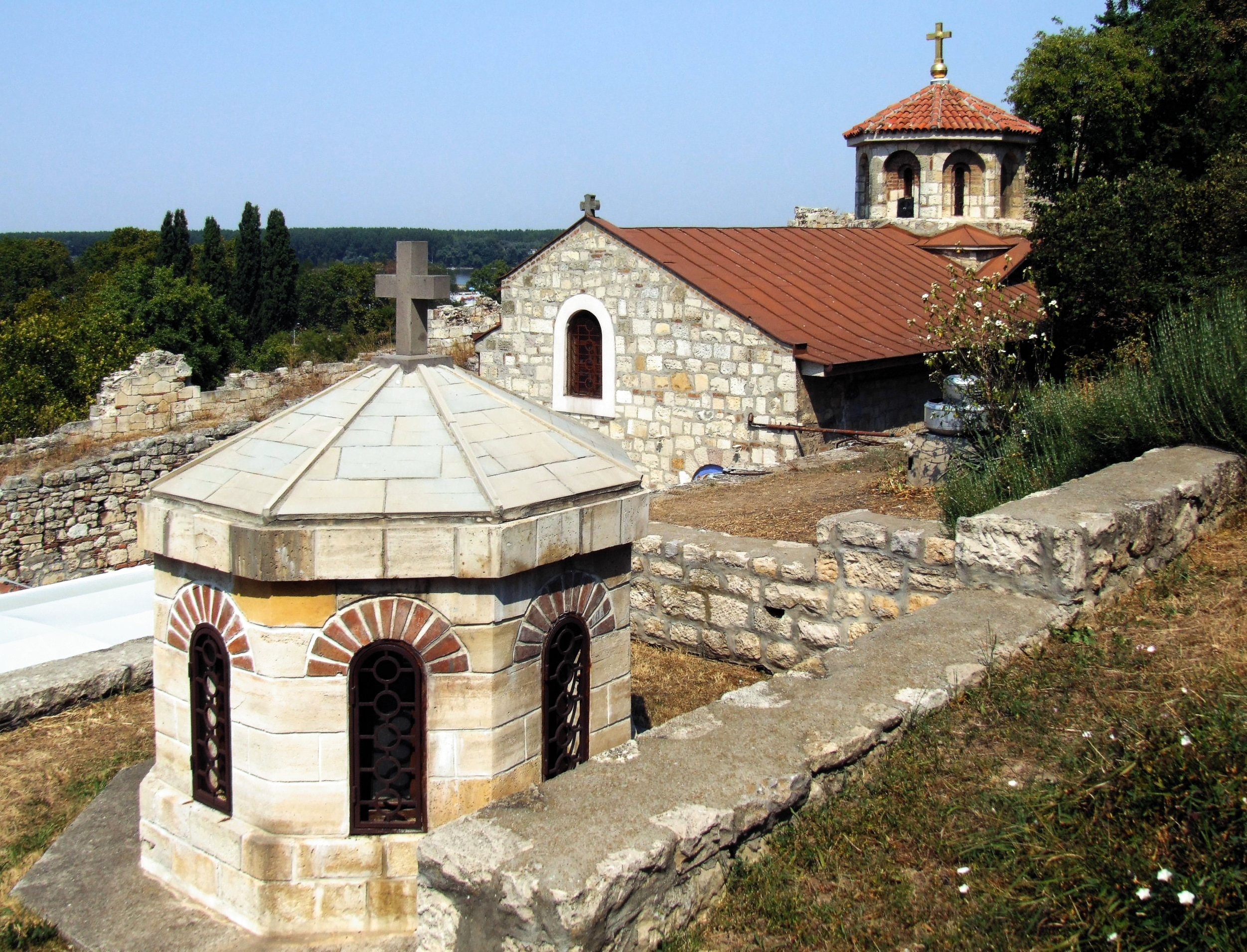

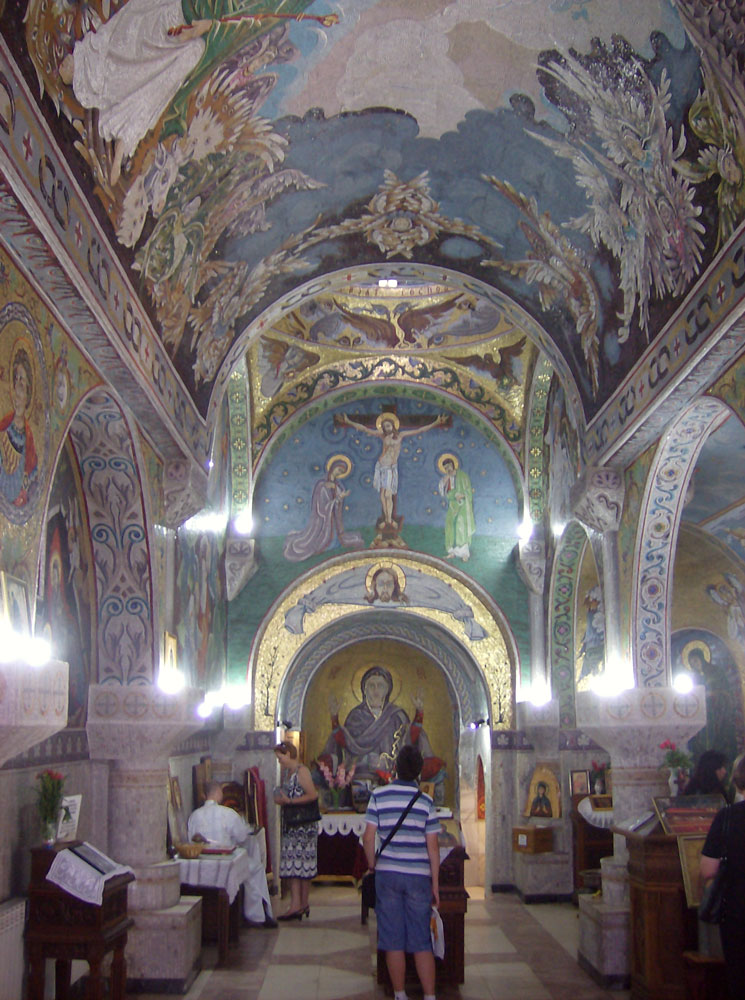

== Literature ==
- Крстионица Свете Петке = The Baptistery of The Chapel of St. Petka / [Радомир В. Поповић; приредио Петар А. Бојковић]. - Београд : Црква рођења Пресвете Богородице, 2005 ([Б. м. : б. и.]). - 23 стр. : илустр.; 17 cm (COBISS 1542237673)
- Преподобна мати Параскева Света Петка / приредио Владимир Вукашиновић. - Нови Сад : Арт-принт, 1999 (Нови Сад : Арт-принт). - 43 стр.; 16 cm Део текста упоредо на срп. и енгл. језику. - На насл. стр. поред места издавања и: Београд (COBISS 148095751)
- Веровах, зато говорих : литургијске омилије и духовне поуке из капеле Свете Петке у Калемегданској тврђави протојереја-ставрофора Владимира Вукашиновића / приредио Никола Јоцић. - Врњци : Интерклима-графика, 2016 (Врњци : Интерклима-графика). - 158 стр. : илустр.; 21 cm (COBISS 227583756)
- Душан Иванчевић: Београдска тврђава и њене светиње; стр. 168, Библиотека Православље, Београд 1970
- Jovica Trkulja: Svet mozaika Djure P. Radlovića; str. 316, Dosje, Beograd 2024 ISBN 9788660474362
