= Patriarch Justinian of Romania =

Patriarch of Romania from 1948 to 1977

His Beatitude Patriarch Justinian of Romania
- By God's mercy, Archbishop of Bucharest, Metropolitan of Ungro-Vlachia, Locum tenens of the throne of Caesarea Cappadociae and Patriarch of All Romania
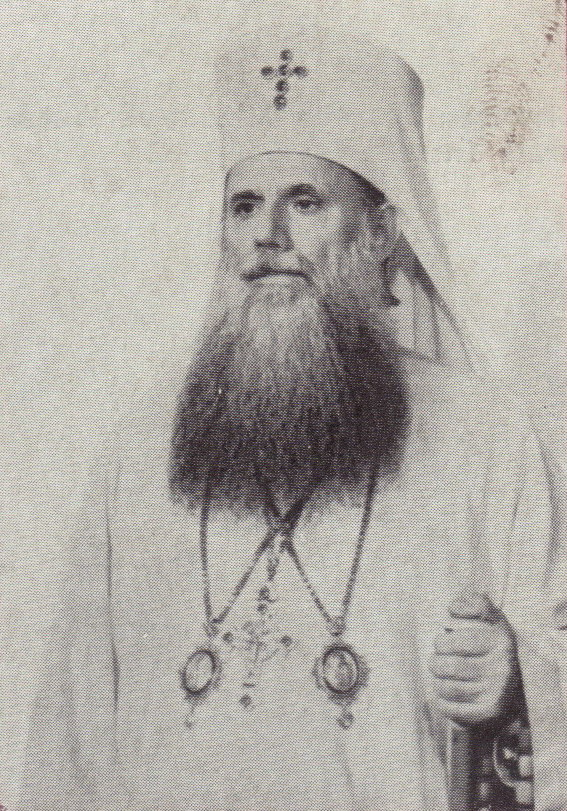
- Patriarch Justinian in 1967
- Church: Romanian Orthodox Church
- See: Bucharest
- Installed: 24 May 1948
- Term ended: 26 March 1977
- Predecessor: Nicodim of Romania
- Successor: Iustin of Romania

Personal details
- Born: Ioan Marina; February 2, 1901 Suiești, Vâlcea County
- Died: March 26, 1977 (aged 76) Bucharest, Romania
- Buried: Radu-Vodă Monastery
- Denomination: Eastern Orthodox

Justinian Marina (Romanian pronunciation: [ˌjustiniˈan maˈrina]; born Ioan Marina [iˈo̯an]; February 2, 1901 – March 26, 1977) was a Romanian Orthodox prelate. He was the third patriarch of the Romanian Orthodox Church, serving between 1948 and 1977.

== Parish priest in the Râmnic Diocese ==
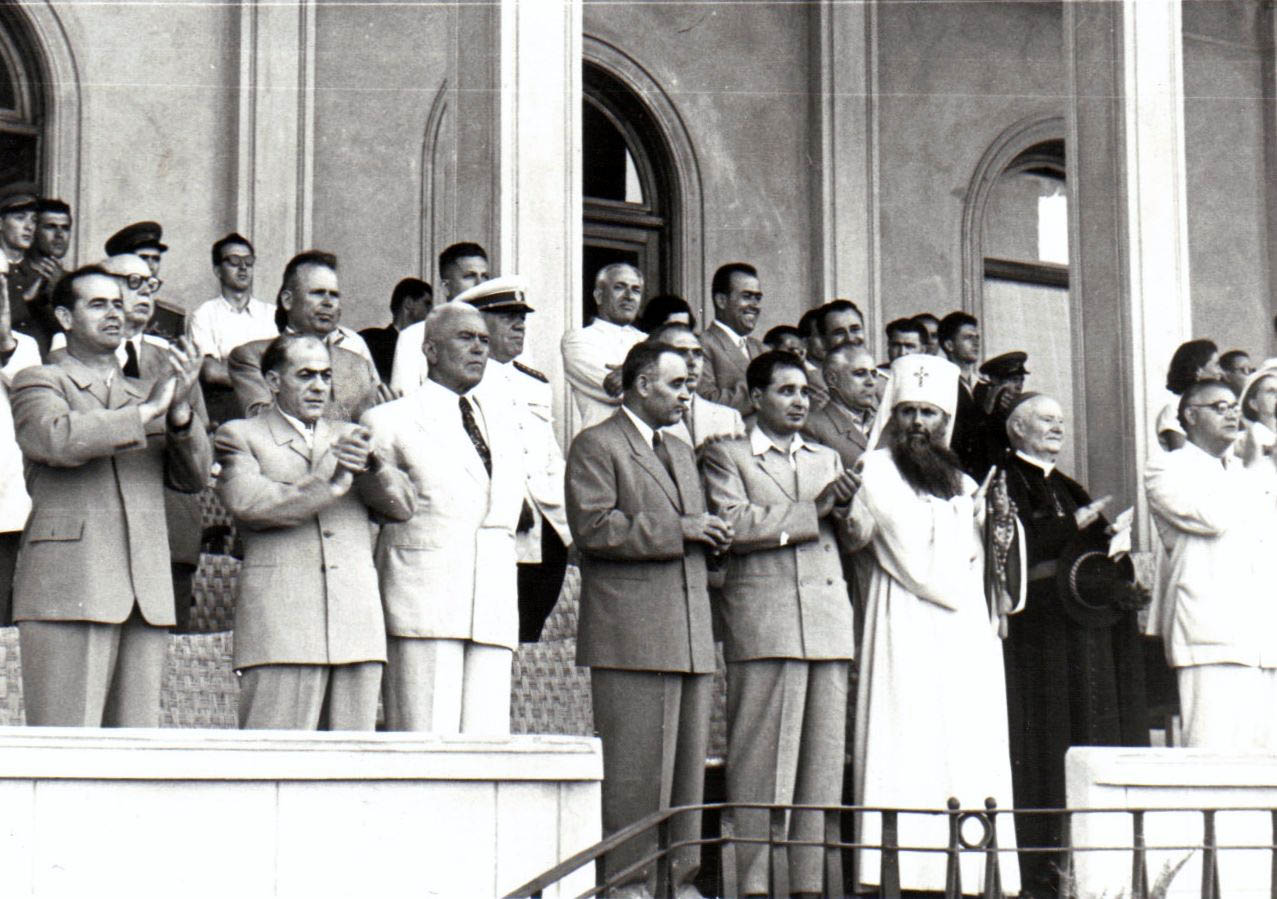
Patriarch Justinian and the Communist leadership of Romania, at the "23 August" Stadium during the opening of the World Festival of Youth and Students (1953)

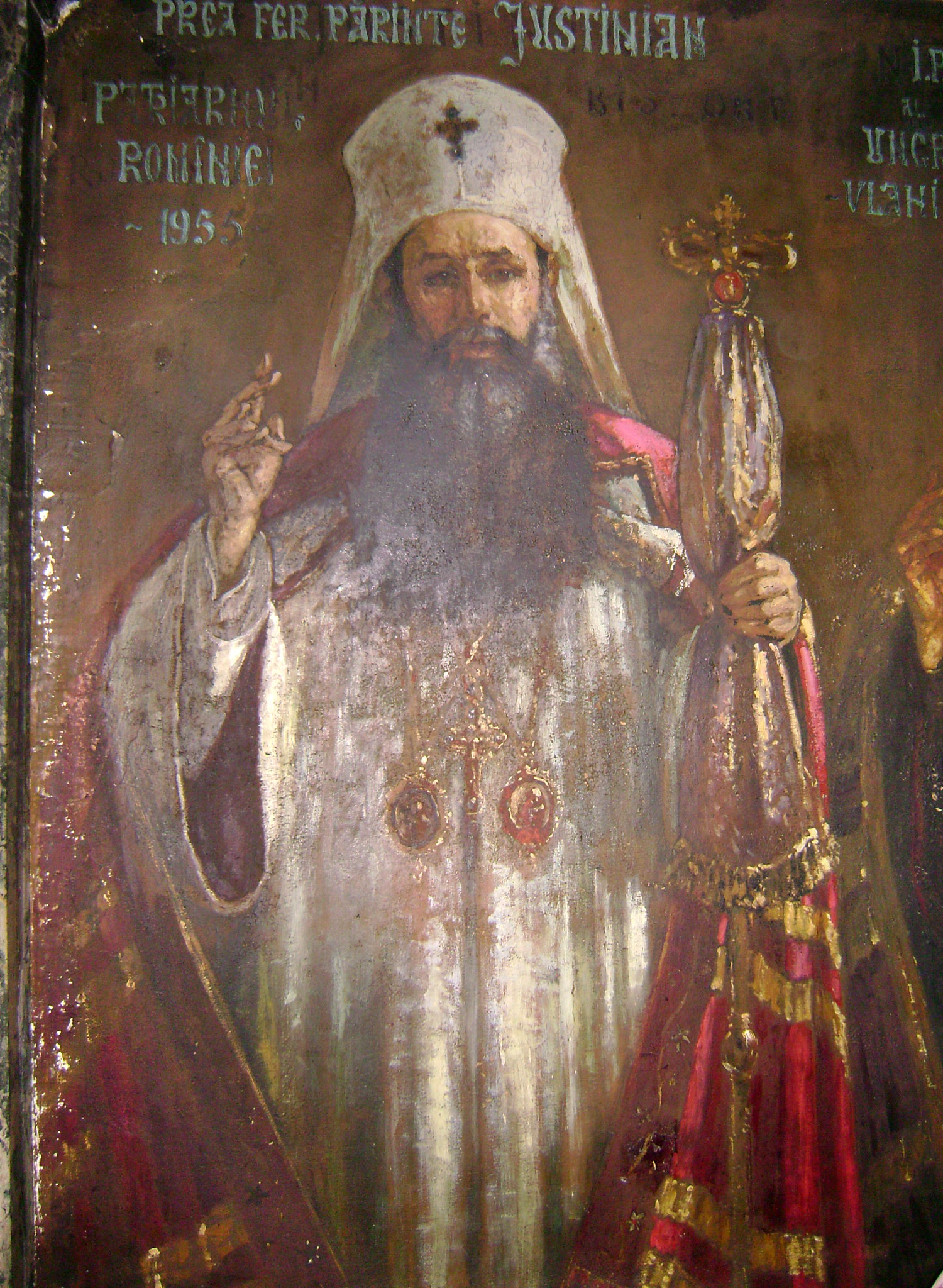
Patriarch Justinian painted inside the walls of Saint Spyridon the New Church – picture taken on Easter Night, 27 April 2008

Ioan Marina was born in the village of Suieşti, in the former commune of Cermegeşti, Vâlcea County, to a family of farmers. As his mother wanted him to become a priest and he had a natural tendency toward learning, in 1915 he entered the St. Nicholas Theological Seminary in Râmnicu Vâlcea. He graduated in 1923, that year also obtaining a teacher's diploma, after taking an examination at the Normal School in the same city.

He began his social work on September 1, 1923, as a teacher at the primary school in Olteanca, Vâlcea County. A year later, on September 1, 1924, he was transferred, also as a teacher, to the primary school in Băbeni, Vâlcea County (then a commune, now a town). Then, on October 14, 1924, he married Lucreţia Popescu, daughter of the priest Pavel Popescu, from the Braloştiţa commune, Dolj County. After this he became a priest in Băbeni, continuing to teach as well.

In 1925 he enrolled as a student at the University of Bucharest's Faculty of Theology, receiving a licentiate in theology in 1929. The next year he quit work as a schoolteacher, becoming a full-time priest. Noticing that the talents of the young priest exceeded those meant for a village priest, Vartolomeu Stănescu, Bishop of Râmnic, called Marina to him and on November 1, 1932, named him director of the St. Nicholas Theological Seminary in Râmnicu Vâlcea. That day he was also assigned as a priest at the Cathedral of Saint Nicholas, Râmnicu Vâlcea.

On September 1, 1933, he was transferred, at his request, to serve as a priest at the parish of St. George, Râmnicu Vâlcea, whose pastorate was then vacant. In 1935 he was named confessor to Râmnicu Vâlcea's scouts, and the next year he became catechizer to the pre-military boys of the city.

Marina's wife died on November 18, 1935, at the age of 27. Left a widower at 34, he did not remarry, raising his children, Silvia and Ovidiu, by himself.

On August 25, 1939, Fr. Marina was moved from the seminary headmastership to be the director of the diocesan printing press. In eight months, he surpassed expectations by paying off all debts to creditors of years past and re-establishing his printing press's credibility on the market. In the spring of 1940, he handed over the printing press, now debt-free, to the newly established Metropolitanate of Craiova. He refused to go to Craiova, being aggrieved at the disestablishment of the Râmnic Diocese on November 7, 1939.

In recognition of his merits, achieved over a decade and a half as a priest, the authorities of the Râmnic Diocese awarded him all priestly honorifics (sakellarios, iconon and iconom stavrofor with the right to wear a red girdle); he was also elected to the Central Council of the General Association of Romanian Clergy. The Minister of Religion, upon the proposal of the Metropolitanate of Craiova, awarded him the "Cultural merit First Class for the Church".

== Archbishop and Metropolitan of Iaşi ==
The future Patriarch Justinian owed his ascendancy within the church hierarchy to the fact that he had helped the Communist leader Gheorghe Gheorghiu-Dej to hide in the parish house at St. George's after the latter's escape from the Târgu Jiu internment camp in 1944. As the prominent Communist Ion Gheorghe Maurer later recalled, "After we passed Craiova by car, about 30 kilometers on, we stopped in a village where we were kept by a priest who was himself the Communists' man. The car went back to Craiova and we stayed in that village about three days until another car from Bucharest came, to take us to the capital."

There are 15 references to Justinian in the book In God's Underground by Richard Wurmbrand, a Lutheran pastor imprisoned by the communist regime. Wurmbrand was in constant trouble with the authorities because of his outspokenness towards the regime but he credits Justinian on using his influence in the early days of his Patriarchate to ensure he was allowed to keep his license to preach. However, later he describes Justinian as having become "wholly a tool of the Party".

The Metropolitan of Moldavia, Irineu Mihălcescu, who had been elected to his position on November 29, 1939, was ill and in serious need of a young, energetic and capable person to help him rebuild the diocese, gravely affected by war damage. The vicar bishop Valeriu Moglan was old and could barely handle the administration of Spiridonia, a large hospital in Iaşi. In the spring of 1945, Metropolitan Irineu asked the Ministry of Religion to set up another post of vicar bishop for the Metropolitanate of Moldavia. Once the request was granted, Metropolitan Irineu, as bishop of the place, proposed Ioan Marina for election to the post. At this point Marina was still at St. George's, a widower for almost a decade, and the metropolitan knew him well, having had him as a student and having encountered him while he was a bishop's assistant at Râmnic and then a metropolitan's assistant at Craiova.

At Metropolitan Irineu's proposal, the Holy Synod, in its July 30, 1945 session, after a canonical investigation and examination, approved Marina's election to the second, newly founded post of vicar bishop, at the Iaşi Metropolitan Cathedral, and accorded him the rank of a titular bishop, with the Titular see of Vaslui. On August 11, 1945, at Cetăţuia Monastery in Iaşi, the priest Ioan Marina was tonsured a monk, receiving the monastic name Justinian and being ordained an archimandrite as well. He was consecrated a bishop on Sunday, August 12, 1945, in the Iaşi Metropolitan Cathedral. He was consecrated by metropolitan Irineu and bishops Antim Nica of Cetatea Albă and Valeriu Moglan of Botoşăni.

On August 16, 1947, the aged and sick Metropolitan Irineu retired from his position and Patriarch Nicodim named Justinian as locum tenens until a permanent successor was elected. On November 19, 1947, the Ecclesiastical Electoral College met at Bucharest, with Metropolitan Nicolae Bălan of Transylvania presiding (the Patriarch was resting at Neamţ Monastery). Justinian Marina was elected Metropolitan of Moldavia. He was enthroned on December 28, 1947, at the Iaşi Metropolitan Cathedral, during a Divine Liturgy celebrated by an assembly of bishops, priests and deacons, in the presence of members of the Holy Synod, of representatives of the central and local governments (two days before the Romanian People's Republic was proclaimed), and of numerous clergy and laymen.

In the three years that he spent at Iaşi as vicar bishop and then Metropolitan of Moldavia, Justinian put in tremendous efforts to rebuild the diocese, heavily damaged by war and scorched by drought. He reorganised the economic section of the diocesan centre, so as to ensure better administration and control over resources, while he established clear objectives for the other sections (administrative and cultural). He restored the cathedral and the metropolitan's residence, as well as the nearby buildings, which had been marred by bullets and shells and left without windows, with cracked walls and holes in their roofs, and with the objects inside scattered and partly lost. He brought these buildings back into a well-functioning state, including the diocesan candle factory, which had almost ceased its activity during the war. At the same time, he hired young, virtuous monks to serve at the cathedral, naming the Archimandrite Teoctist Arăpaşu to the post of ecclesiarch. A severe drought in 1946–47 affected Moldavia, adding to the misery left by the war. Metropolitan Justinian permitted the first procession featuring the coffin containing the relics of Saint Parascheva, kept at Iaşi since then. The relics wended their way through the drought-deserted villages of Iaşi, Vaslui, Roman, Bacău, Putna, Neamţ, Baia and Botoşani Counties. The offerings collected on this occasion were distributed, based on Metropolitan Justinian's decisions, to orphans, widows, invalids, school cafeterias, churches under construction, and to monasteries in order to feed the sick, and old or feeble monks.

On February 27, 1948, Patriarch Nicodim died at the age of 83 under conditions viewed as suspect by some historians. He left vacant the seat of Patriarch of All Romania. To head the church in these uncertain times, a man was sought who had a lucid and penetrating mind, an organising spirit, and who was young, sufficiently energetic to defend the Church from the attempts of the Communist regime to dismantle it.

== Elected Patriarch of the Romanian Orthodox Church ==
The Great Ecclesiastical Electoral College, meeting in Bucharest on May 24, 1948, elected Justinian Marina Patriarch of All Romania. A statement of the Synod said that he had "shown himself worthy through his devotion to Orthodoxy, through his tireless ministry work until now, through a fruitful labour on behalf of the people and the Church, through a rather well-known parental tenderness, showing through the fulfillment of all the tasks and duties which he was assigned an unflappable obedience toward the Holy Synod and the laws of the country".

On June 6, 1948, at the investiture ceremony in the hall of the Palace of the Parliament and the installation ceremony in St. Spiridon the New Church, Bucharest, Patriarch Justinian presented the agenda of his patriarchate. Among his objectives were: to prepare the clergy in the spirit of Orthodoxy and of the demands of the times; to restore Romanian monasticism; to reorganise theological education; to reunite the Church by returning the Greek-Catholics to Orthodoxy (their ancestors having left it in the Union of 1700); to strengthen brotherly relations with all Orthodox churches; to promote ecumenical relations with other Christian churches, etc.

In response to Patriarch Justinian's call to Greek-Catholic believers, on October 1, 1948, 37 Greek-Catholic priests and archpriests assembled in a gymnasium in Cluj to sign a declaration that they would convert to the Romanian Orthodox Church, as they no longer wished to receive orders from "Imperialist Rome". Two days later, their emissaries presented themselves at Bucharest under police escort before the Holy Synod, asking to be received into Orthodoxy. Prior to that, they had been laicized by their superior, Bishop Iuliu Hossu. As evident from this reference to Imperialism, this was a political move as well as a religious one, fitting in with the Cold War and denying the West a possible leverage in Romania. On October 21, 1948, a large popular assembly took place at Alba Iulia, organised by the Interior Ministry. 20,000 Greek-Catholic clergy (including those who had signed the declaration at Cluj) and laity from across Transylvania participated; they were solemnly received into the Romanian Orthodox Church.

== Achievements as Patriarch ==
Despite many difficulties, during the 29 years of Justinian's reign, a series of events and changes took place which greatly raised the prestige of Romanian Orthodoxy in the Christian world and made him a representative figure for all of Orthodoxy. On October 19–20, 1948, the Holy Synod approved the Statute that determined the organisation and functioning of the Romanian Orthodox Church; henceforth there would be just five metropolitanates, with thirteen suffragan dioceses, to which were added two Romanian dioceses for the diaspora.

In 1950 the Holy Synod decided, for the first time, to canonize several Romanian hierarchs, monks and pious believers, and to generalize the cult of certain saints whose relics are found in Romania. Their solemn canonization took place in 1955.

Justinian built a nursing home for elderly priests and monks in Dealu and for elderly nuns and priests' wives in Viforâta. In 1948, Orthodox theological education was reorganised along lines that would last until 1989: two university-level theological institutes existed (at Bucharest and Sibiu), as well as six theological seminaries (at Bucharest, Buzău, Neamţ Monastery, Cluj, Craiova and Caransebeş).

Justinian maintained links with the other Orthodox churches and with other Christian churches. At the head of synodal delegations, he visited the following Orthodox churches: Russian (several times), Georgian (1948), Serbian (1957), Bulgarian (1953, 1966 and 1971), the Ecumenical Patriarchate of Constantinople (1968), the Churches of Alexandria (1971) and Jerusalem (1975) and the Church of Greece (1963, 1971 and 1975). He began relations with Oriental Orthodox churches, through reciprocal visits. Justinian travelled to the Armenian Catholicosate at Echmiadzin (1958 and 1966), to the Ethiopian Church (1969 and 1971), to the Coptic Church (1969 and 1971) and to the Indian Orthodox Church (1969). Relations were begun and maintained with a number of national Roman Catholic Churches, some visited by Justinian at the head of synodal delegations: Austria (1969), Germany (1970) and Belgium (1972), with the Old Catholic Church and the Church of England (1966). In return, delegations from all these churches visited Patriarch Justinian and his church. In 1961 the Romanian Orthodox Church re-entered the World Council of Churches and has since participated in other ecumenical organisations, such as the Conference of European Churches.

Patriarch Justinian published 12 volumes entitled Apostolat social ("Social Apostolate", Bucharest, 1948–76), containing all his pastoral letters, speeches and articles. New church periodicals appeared, or old ones continued to be published, and a series of periodicals edited by Romanian Orthodox communities abroad. The synodal Bible was re-edited, in two editions (1968 and 1975); the New Testament; all devotional books, each in multiple editions; nearly all textbooks needed for higher and seminarial theological education; and there appeared a series of theological or historic works written by bishops, professors of theology, and priests, as well as doctoral theses.

During Justinian's reign, 302 new churches were built, 2345 others were repaired or restored. Of these, 999 were historic monuments, and of these 128 were monasteries, sketes and other monastic communities. The new churches were painted as well, while a further 271 churches had their paintings restored.

== Later years and death ==
From his enthronement to his death, as Mihai Urzică writes, "faced with the adversities to which the Church was subjected, Patriarch Justinian proved himself an able diplomat and tried, as much as he could, to withstand the attacks launched against the house of the Lord. He maintained a close unity among the ranks of the clergy, he provided support for priests who were political detainees and monks released from prison and restored many churches and monasteries, resisting the sanctions, threats and even the house arrest to which, for a time, he was subjected".

Justinian protested against Decree 410 of November 19, 1959, which ordered that new monks must be at least 55 years old and nuns at least 50, and due to which some 5,000 monastics were removed from their monasteries. In response, the Patriarch was forcibly sent to Dragoslavele skete for six months.

Patriarch Justinian died on the evening of March 26, 1977, aged 76, after a painful illness and a long period of hospitalisation. He was laid to rest in the grave which he carefully prepared for himself in the interior wall of Radu Vodă Monastery, Bucharest (the monastery, dating from the 16th century, had been extensively renovated during 1969–1974, on his initiative). On the cross fixed into the wall, the Patriarch asked that the following inscription be engraved: "I fought the good fight. I guarded the faith. I have reached the end of life's road. From now on, the reward of righteousness awaits me; the Lord, the righteous Judge shall give it to me on that day".

== Offices held ==
- Teacher in Olteanca (1923–1924)
- Teacher in Băbeni (1924–1930)
- Parish priest in Băbeni (1924–1932)
- Director of the theological seminary and priest at the Râmnicu Vâlcea Cathedral (1932–1933)
- Parish priest at St. George's Church in Râmnicu Vâlcea (1933–1945)
- Vicar Bishop (called "Vasluianul") of the Iaşi Archdiocese (1945–1947)
- Locum tenens Metropolitan of Iaşi (from August 1947)
- Archbishop of Iaşi and Metropolitan of Moldova and Suceava (elected 19 November 1947, enthroned 28 December 1947)
- Locum tenens Patriarch of Romania (from February 1948)
- Archbishop of Bucharest, Metropolitan of Ungro-Vlachia, Patriarch of All Romania (elected 24 May 1948, enthroned 6 June 1948)

== Notes ==
Eastern Orthodox Church titles
Preceded by Nicodim Munteanu	Patriarch of All Romania; 1948–1977	Succeeded by Iustin Moisescu
Preceded by Irineu Mihălcescu	Metropolitan Bishop of Moldavia; 1947-1948	Succeeded by Sebastian Rusan
