= Metropolitan Cathedral, Iași =

Iași Metropolitan Cathedral
- Romanian: Catedrala Mitropolitană din Iași
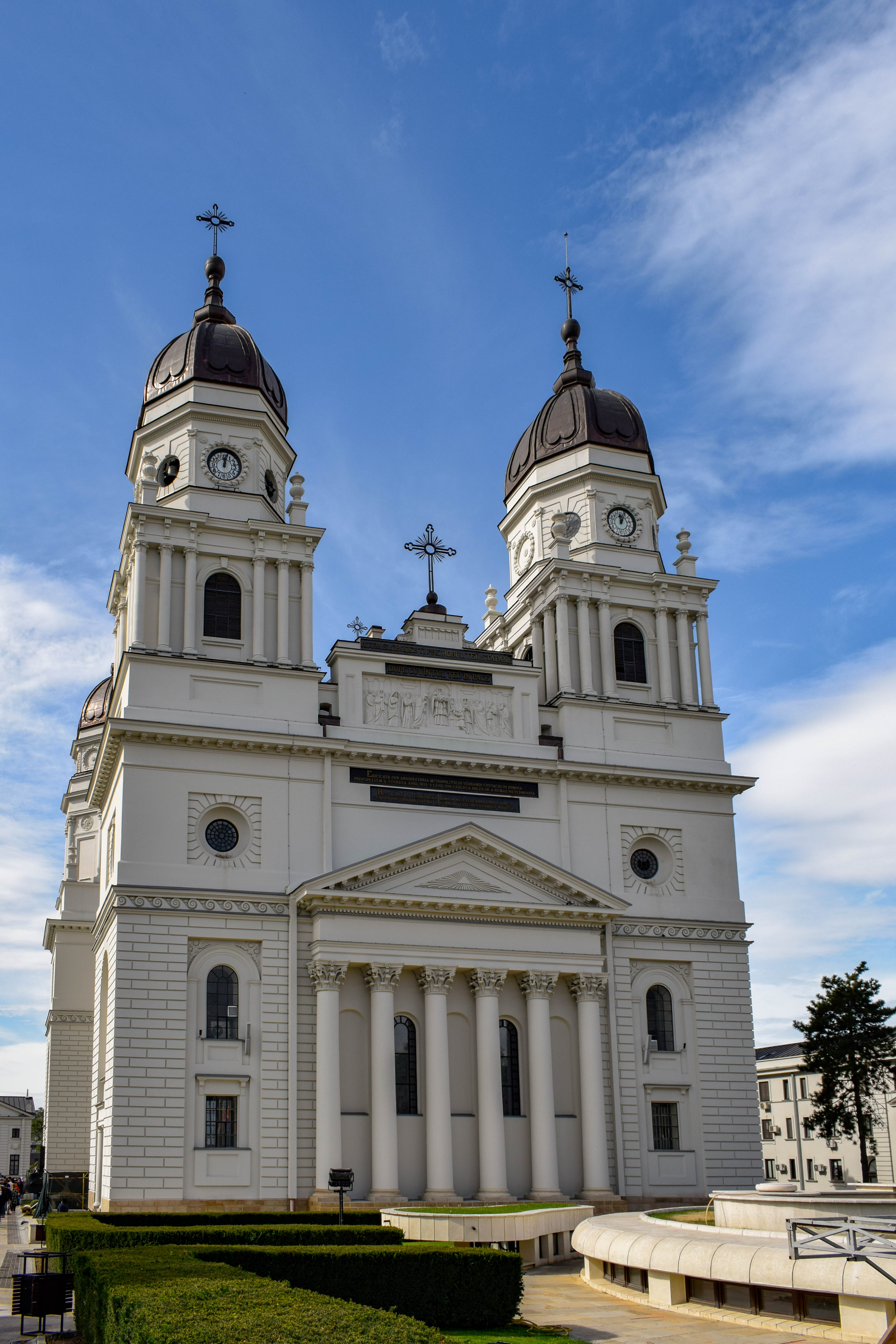
- Iași Metropolitan Cathedral
- 47°09′41″N 27°34′56″E
- Location: Iași
- Country: Romania
- Denomination: Eastern Orthodox

History
- Consecrated: 1887

Architecture
- Functional status: Active
- Architect(s): Gustav Freywald, Bucher, Mihail Singurov, Alexandru Orăscu
- Style: Neoclassical
- Groundbreaking: 1833
- Completed: 1839/1886

Specifications
- Materials: Brick, concrete

Administration
- Metropolis: Moldavia and Bukovina

The Metropolitan Cathedral, Iași (Romanian: Catedrala Mitropolitană din Iași), located at 16 Ștefan cel Mare și Sfânt Boulevard, Iași, Romania, is the seat of the Romanian Orthodox Archbishop of Iași and Metropolitan of Moldavia and Bukovina, and the largest historic Orthodox church in Romania. It is dedicated to Saint Parascheva, to the Presentation of Jesus and to Saint George. Its form was inspired by the late Italian Renaissance style (Trinità dei Monti in particular), with Baroque elements dominating the interior and exterior decorative features. The Metropolitan Cathedral is listed in the National Register of Historic Monuments.

== History ==
Two churches previously stood on the site: the White Church (15th century) and the Presentation Church (17th century). On 8 August 1826, prince Ioan Sturdza signed a decree ordering construction of the cathedral; Metropolitan Veniamin Costache laid the cornerstone on 3 July 1833 and guided construction in its early years. Work began in 1833, using a neo-classical design by Viennese architects Gustav Freywald and Bucher, and continued at a rapid pace until 1841, in the latter years under the Russian architect Mihail Singurov. In 1839, after it was completely built and covered, serious cracks had appeared on the large central arch. Various solutions were attempted (in 1840 Singurov replaced the brick ceiling with wood, for example), but on 23 May 1857, the ceiling collapsed taking the interior columns with it, and the building remained ruined for decades.

At the urging of Metropolitan Iosif Naniescu (1875–1902), the newly independent Romanian state decided to start the restoration work of the cathedral. A new cornerstone was laid on 15 April 1880. Architect Alexandru Orăscu, rector of the University of Bucharest, designed new plans that added two rows of massive pilasters to the interior, creating a rectangular basilica shape, with a central nave and two smaller side naves. The four detached side spires were kept, but the large central dome was eliminated and replaced with a system of four semicircular sections, separated by transverse arches.

The cathedral was consecrated on 23 April 1887, in the presence of King Carol I and Queen Elisabeth, who had donated large sums for the project. In 1889, the relics of Saint Parascheva, patron saint of Moldavia, were brought from Trei Ierarhi Monastery and continue to attract crowds of pilgrims, particularly on her feast day (October 14). These are located on the right side of the vestibule, as are those of Veniamin Costache.

== Architecture ==
Standing in the centre of the Metropolitan Complex, the Great Cathedral is a monumental building of a rectangular plan with four detached towers at its corners that originally flanked an immense dome. The cathedral is 56.70 metres (186.0 ft) long and 34.15 metres (112.0 ft) wide, and with a height of the towers of 52.92 metres (173.6 ft), it is one of the tallest historical buildings in Moldavia.

The exterior of the cathedral, as well as the interior, is decorated in the Baroque style. The eastern façade has a central motif formed of six Corinthian columns erected on a stone socle, which support the architrave, above which is a high bas-relief of the Presentation of the Lord. The western façade has eight columns separated by the entrance, above which there is a recessed balcony whose vault has a curved mosaic also showing the Presentation; above that is a stone carving of Saint George. The roof is decorated with zinc fleurons and stylized crosses adorn both the roof and the four spires.

Gheorghe Tattarescu painted the icons and decorative elements in a style that respected Orthodox norms but also showed a Renaissance influence. The four Biblical scenes above the central nave, the saints' faces and the decorative compositions all show an Italian neo-classical rigor, to which the artist had been exposed during his studies at Rome's Accademia di San Luca. This creates harmony between the painting and the architectural style. The stained glass was worked in Munich and redone after World War II, under Metropolitan Justinian Marina. Two valuable icons painted in the 16th century are kept inside; they depict Christ Pantocrator and the Madonna and Child.

== Metropolitan Complex ==
In the environs of the monumental church there are St George's Church (the Old Metropolitan Cathedral) built in 1761–1769, the Metropolitan Palace (18th century), the Metropolitan Chancellery, the Dumitru Stăniloae Metropolitan Library, the St. George monastic home, the Epivata house, and the Faculty of Orthodox Theology (founded in 1860 as a co-founder faculty of the University of Iași).

=== Museum ===
In May 2016, the Metropolitan Museum dedicated to the history of the Metropolis of Moldavia and Bukovina was inaugurated in the basement of the Great Cathedral.

== Gallery ==
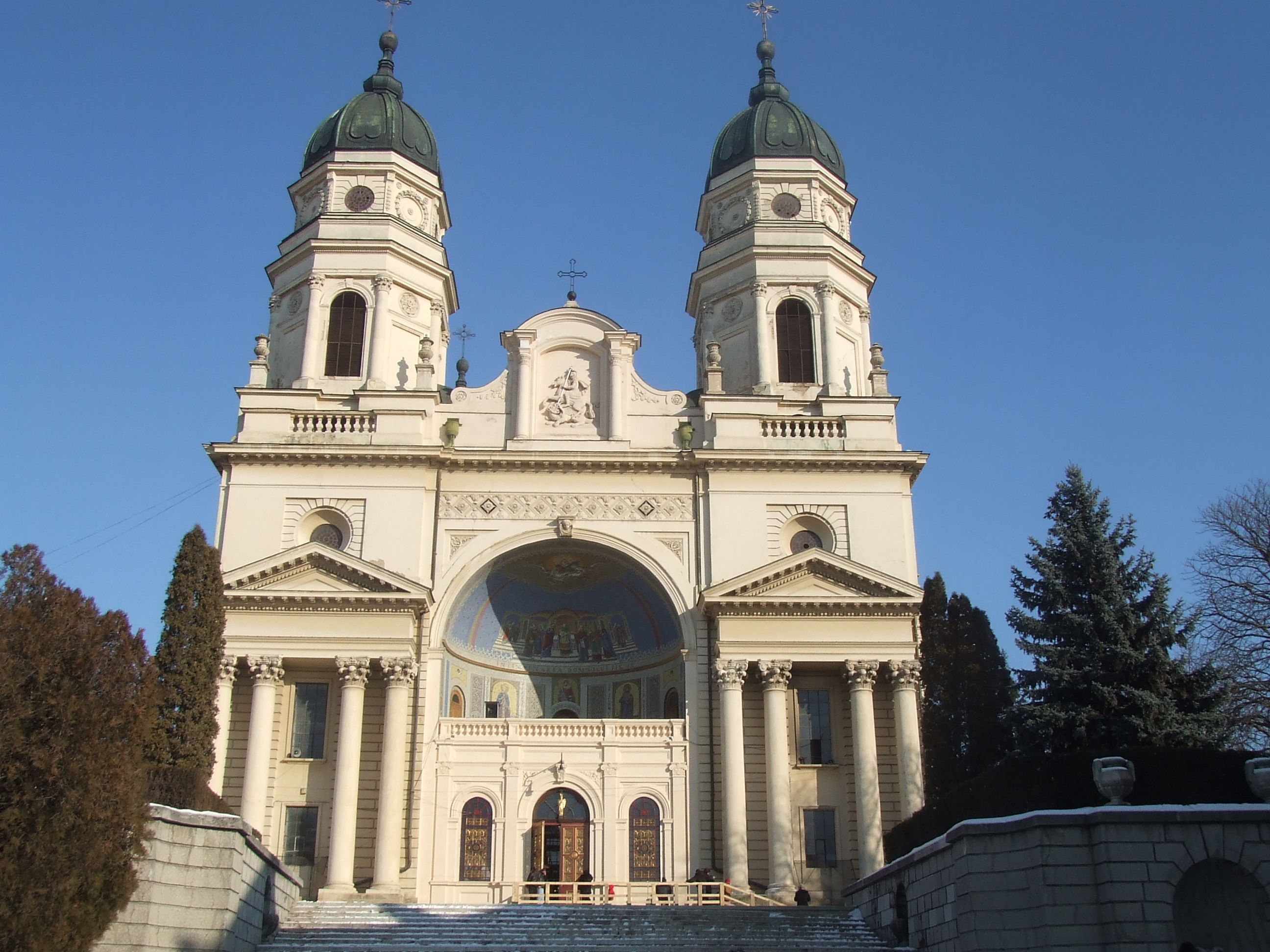
Western façade

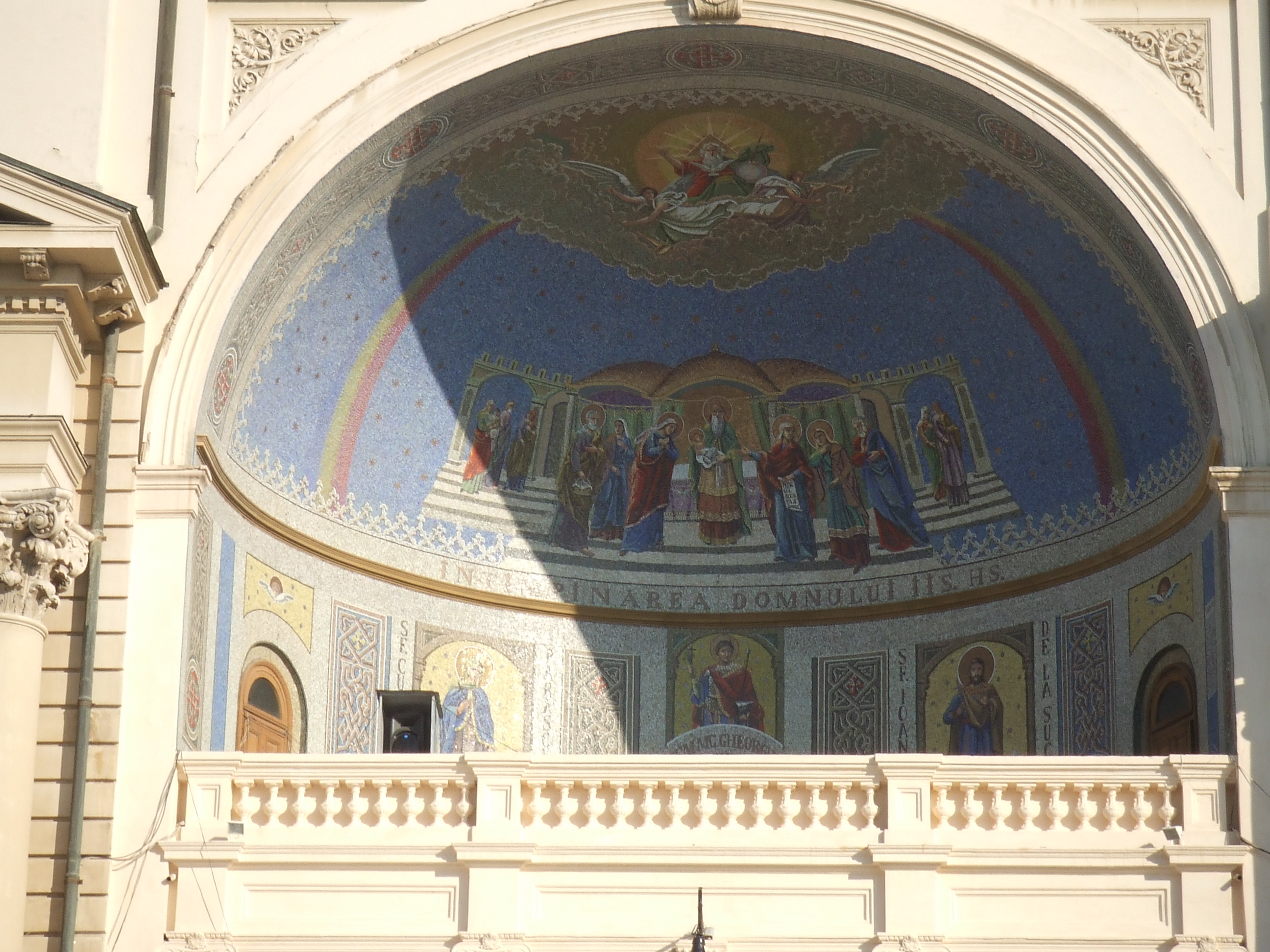
Detail of mosaic showing the Presentation of Jesus

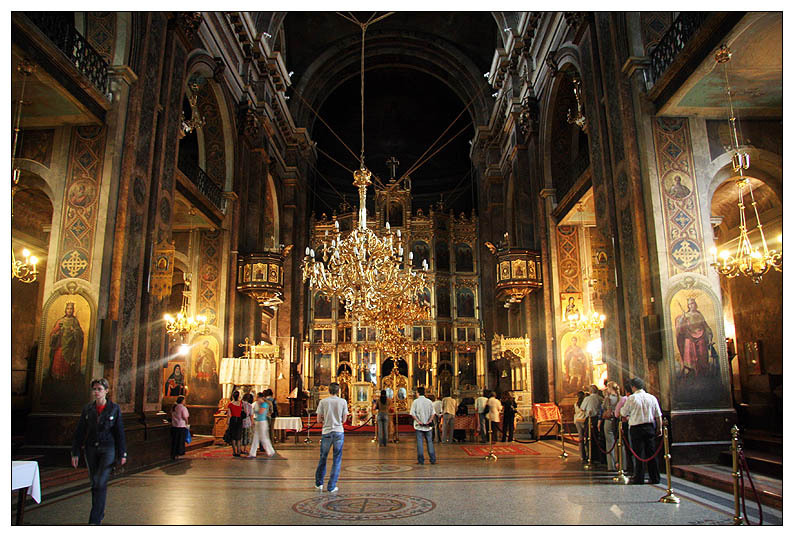
Interior

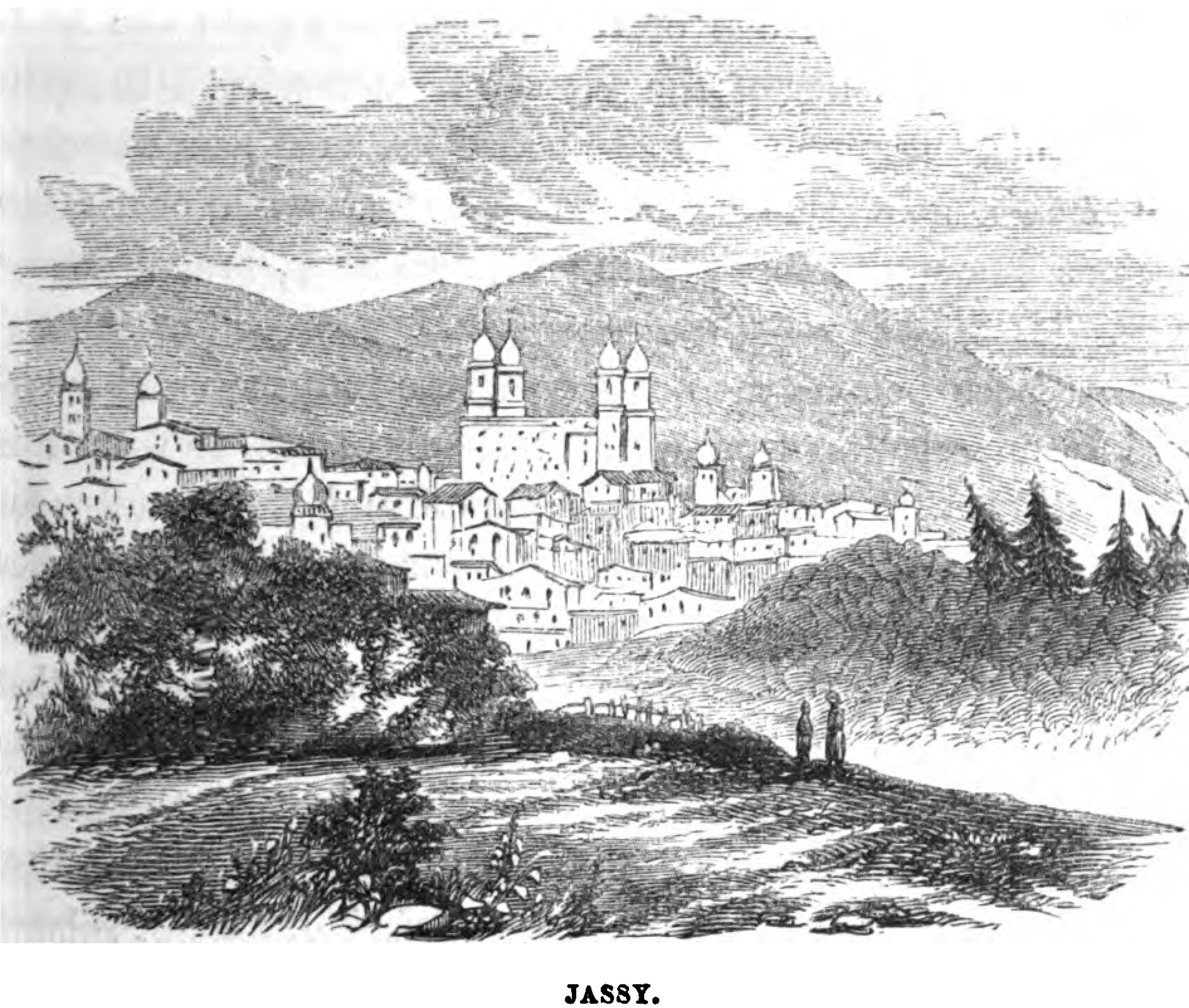
The cathedral before 1855

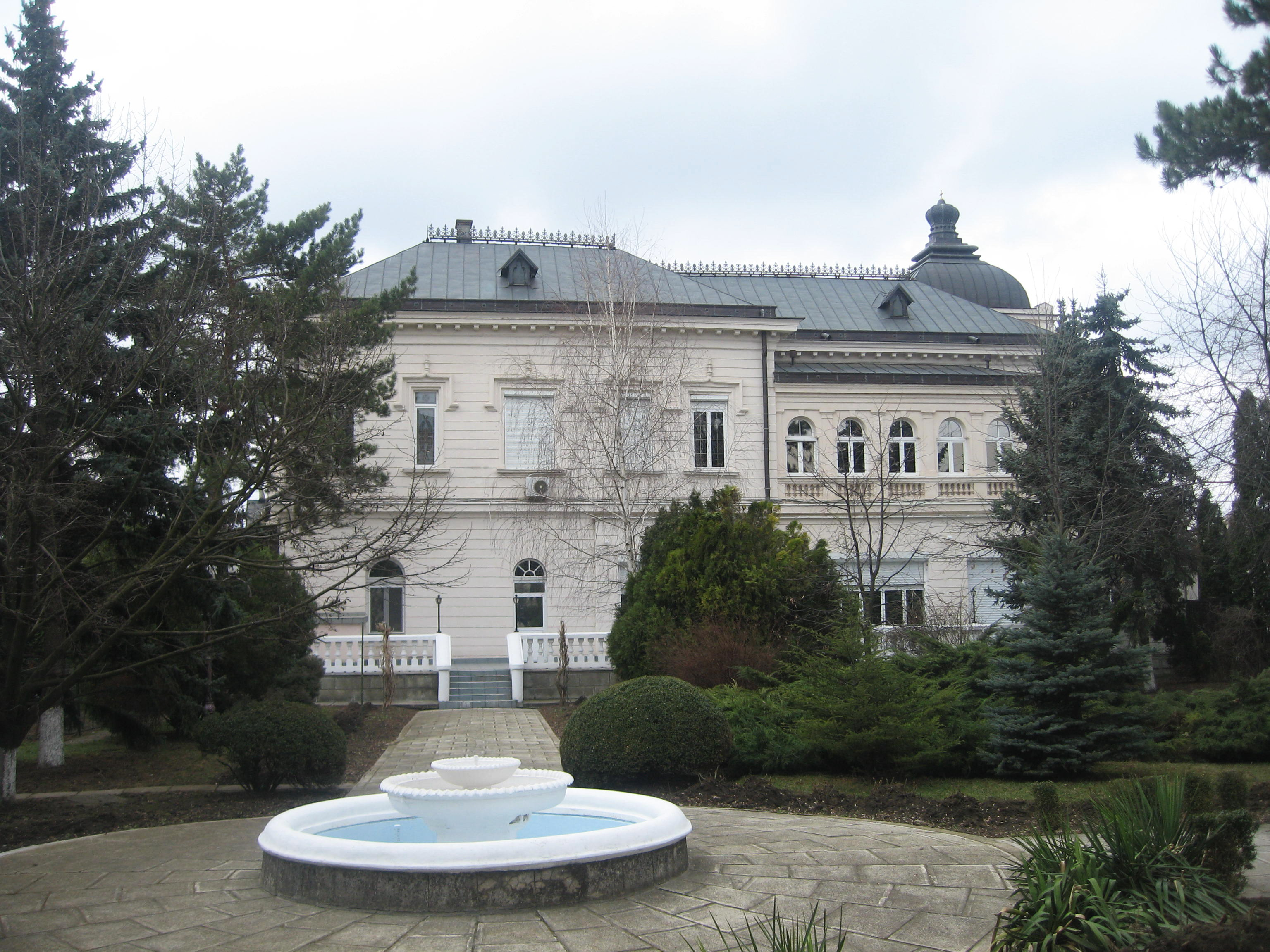
The Metropolitan Palace

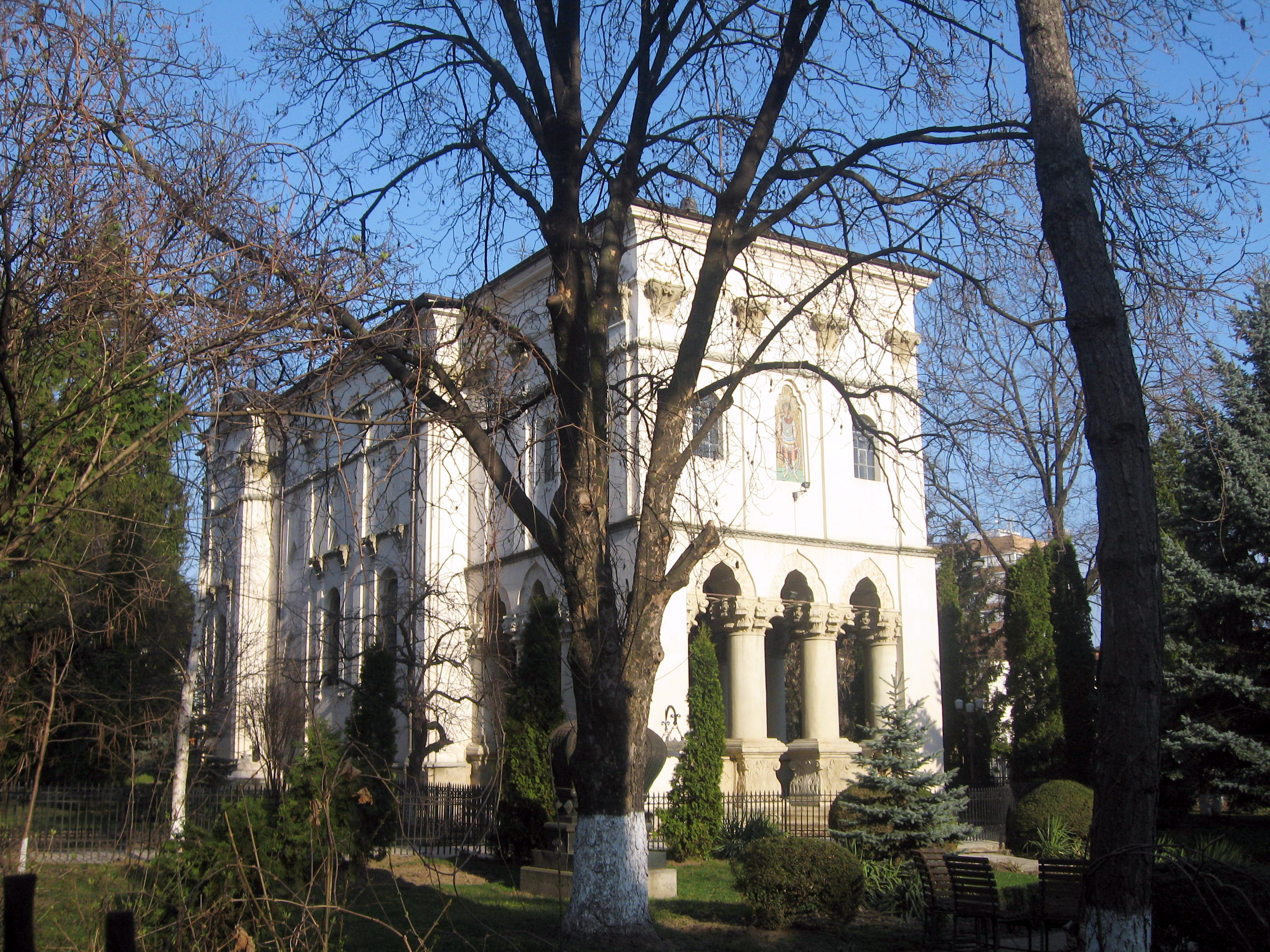
The Old Metropolitan Cathedral

== See also ==
- List of largest Eastern Orthodox church buildings
