= Selimpaşa =

- Neighbourhood
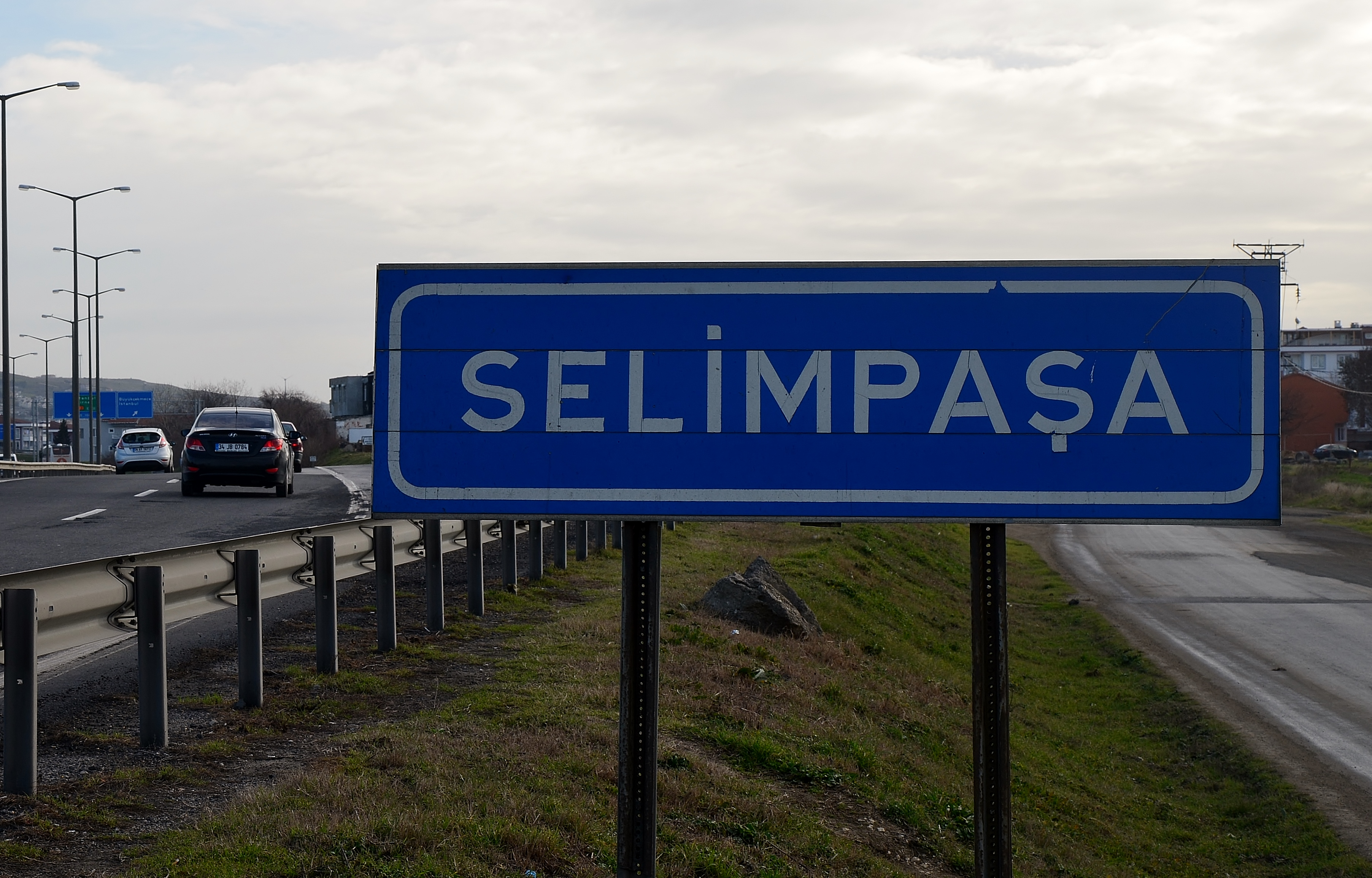
- Place name sign of Selimpaşa at state road D.100

- Location within Turkey Location within Istanbul
- Coordinates: 41.054°N 28.367°E
- Country: Turkey
- Province: Istanbul
- District: Silivri
- Population (2022): 23,378
- Time zone: UTC+3 (TRT)

Selimpaşa, known in Byzantine times as Epibates (sometimes as Epivates or Epibatos; Greek: Επιβάτες), is a neighbourhood in the municipality and district of Silivri, Istanbul Province, in the European part of Turkey. Its population is 23,378 (2022). It was an independent municipality until it was merged into the municipality of Silivri in 2008.

The town is located on the northwestern coast of the Marmara Sea, 50 km (31 mi) west of Istanbul and 13 km (8.1 mi) east from Silivri on the highway D.100.

The town is the native place of the 10th-century Orthodox saint St Paraskevi and was populated mostly by Greeks until the population exchange in the 1920s. Most of these Greeks then founded the town of Neoi Epivates near Thessaloniki.

Selimpaşa today is a summer resort with long sandy beaches.
