= Paraskeva of the Balkans =

10th-century ascetic female saint

Saint Paraskeva of the Balkans
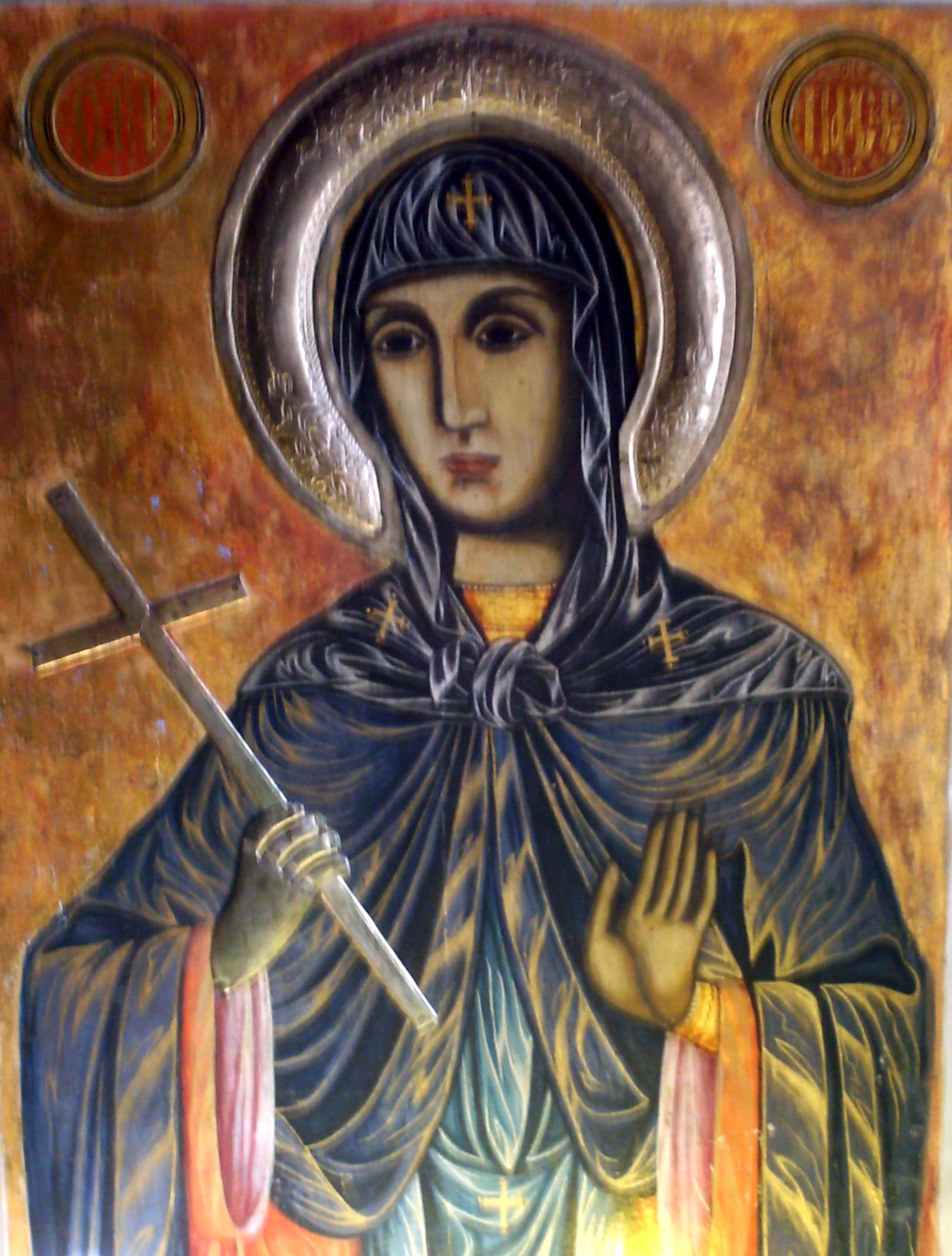
- Icon of St Petka, Klisura Monastery, Bulgaria

Venerable
- Born: Epivates (modern-day Selimpaşa, Istanbul, Turkey)
- Died: 11th century Kallikrateia (modern-day Greece)
- Venerated in: Eastern Orthodox Church
- Major shrine: Metropolitan Cathedral of Iaşi, Romania; Church of St Paraskeva, Nesebar, Bulgaria
- Feast: 14 October (Julian calendar); 27 October (Gregorian calendar)
- Patronage: embroiderers, needle workers, spinners, weavers

Paraskeva of the Balkans, (Note: Bulgarian: Света Петка Българска, Petka of Bulgaria, Petka of Serbia, Paraskeva of Serbia, Paraskeva the Serbian, Paraskeva of Belgrade, Parascheva the New, Parascheva the Young, Ancient Greek: Ὁσία Παρασκευὴ ἡ Ἐπιβατινή, Greek: Οσία Παρασκευή η Επιβατινή ή Νέα, Romanian: Sfânta Cuvioasă Parascheva, or Serbian: Петка Параскева, Serbian: Петка Македонка, Paraskeva Pyatnitsa, Parascheva of Tirnovo) alternatively known as Petka, was an ascetic female saint of the 11th century. She was born in Epivates, near Constantinople, and, according to legends, had visions of the Virgin Mary. After living in Chalcedon and Heraclea Pontica, she settled in a convent in the desert near the Jordan River. An angel told her to return to her homeland, and two years later she died at the age of 27. Veneration of Saint Paraskeva began to spread in the 14th century from Bulgaria into the Danubian Principalities of Wallachia and Moldavia. There was confusion over her identity and attributes because her Greek name Παρασκευή "Paraskeuḗ, Paraskevi" means "Friday," and translations in other languages, such as Romanian and Serbian, were "Saint Friday". Her life continues to be celebrated in many Orthodox countries, and her feast day is commemorated on October 14 (Julian calendar), October 27 (Gregorian calendar) in the Eastern Orthodox Church.

== Life ==
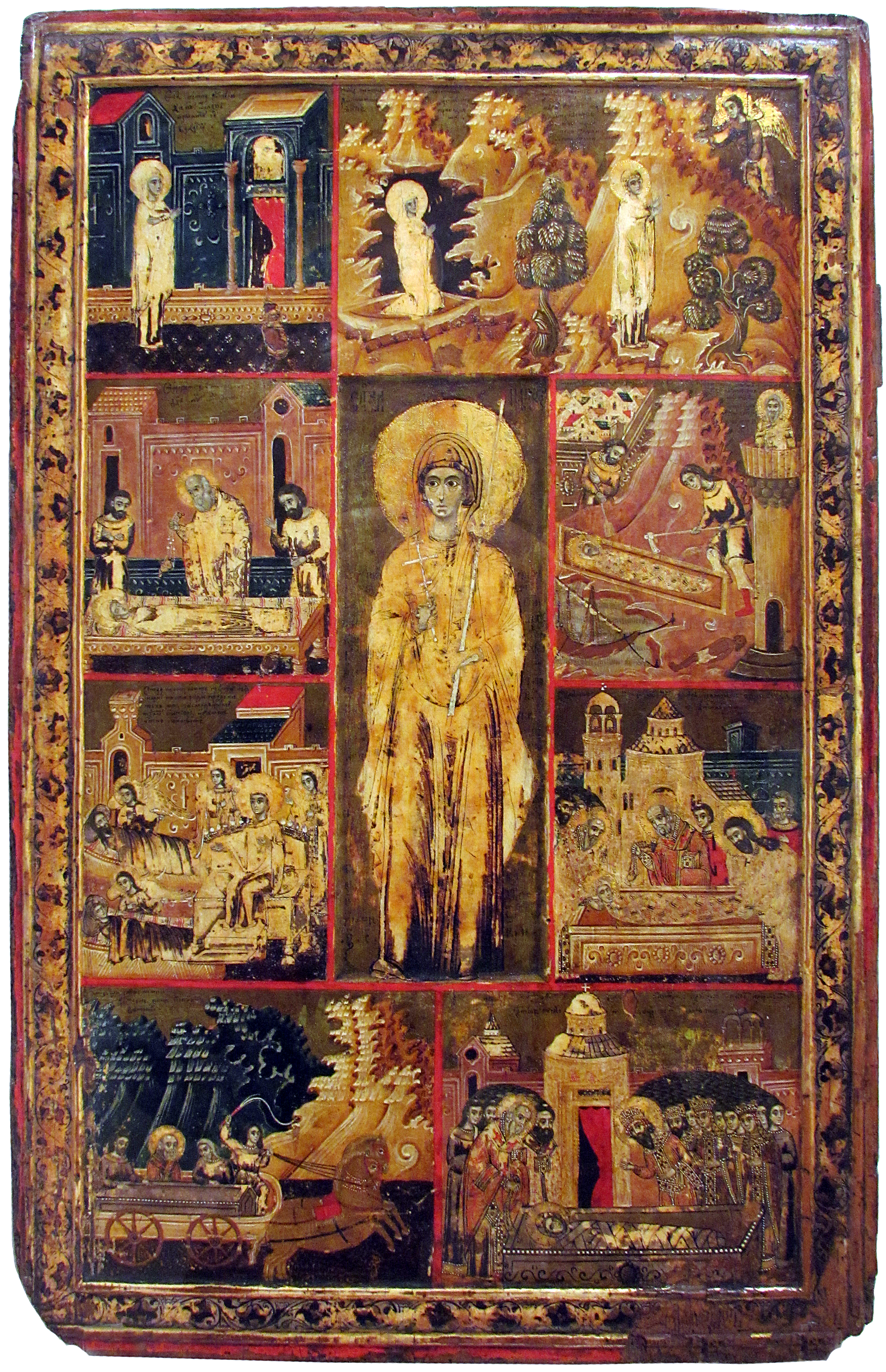
Visual hagiography of St Paraskeva (Patriarchate of Peć, 1719–20).

Paraskeva was born in the town of Epivates (today's Selimpaşa, close to Istanbul) on the shore of the Sea of Marmara. Her parents were wealthy landowners.

Legend says that as a child, Paraskeva heard in a church the Lord's words: "Whoever wants to come after Me, let him deny himself, and take up his cross, and follow Me." (Mark 8, 34). These words would determine her to give her rich clothes away to the poor and to flee to Constantinople. Her parents, who did not support her decision to follow an ascetic, religious life, looked for her in various cities. Paraskeva fled to Chalcedon in Asia Minor, and afterwards lived at the church of the Most Holy Theotokos in Heraclea Pontica in Bithynia. She led an austere life, experiencing visions of the Virgin Mary. Her travels took her to Jerusalem; she wished to spend the rest of her life there. After seeing Jerusalem, she settled in a convent in the desert near the Jordan River.

When she was 25, an angel appeared, telling her to return to her homeland. She returned to Constantinople and then settled down a short distance west, living the last two years of her life in the village of Kallikrateia, in the church of the Holy Apostles, where she died age 27. The former village is now a neighbourhood in Eastern Thrace called Mimarsinan.

== Relics ==
=== Discovery ===
According to Christian tradition, many years after Paraskeva's death, an old sinner was buried near her long-forgotten grave in Kallikrateia, after which Paraskeva appeared in a dream to a local monk and complained about the impure neighbor. The vision informed the monk where she had been buried; when the body was unearthed, it was found to be incorrupt. The relics were translated to the church of the Holy Apostles in Kallikrateia.

=== Relics' journey ===
In subsequent years, Paraskeva's relics were transferred to various churches in the region.

==== Bulgaria ====
In 1238, the relics were transferred from Kallikrateia to Veliko Tarnovo, capital of the Second Bulgarian Empire. In Bulgaria she is venerated as Sveta Petka Tarnovska, "of Tarnovo".

==== Serbia ====
In 1393, they were transferred to Belgrade, specifically the Ružica Church.

==== Constantinople ====
When Belgrade fell to Ottoman forces in 1521, the relics were transferred to Constantinople.

==== Moldavia, now Romania ====
In 1641, the relics were transferred to Trei Ierarhi Monastery, in Iaşi, Moldavia (nowadays, eastern part of Romania).

In 1888, they were transferred to the Metropolitan Cathedral of Iaşi.

== Veneration ==
=== Confusion with other characters ===
The name Paraskeva of the Balkans became conflated with that of other saints with the same name as well as pre-Christian deities of the Slavs, leading to confusion about Paraskeva's identity and attributes.

The confusion occurred in part because the original Greek name of Paraskeva was Παρασκευή, meaning "preparation [of the Sabbath]," understood as "Friday," and was literally translated to various languages as "Saint Friday" (such as "Sveta Petka" in Serbian, "Sfânta Vineri" in Romanian). Scholars sometimes misunderstood the translated name and connected it with a certain character from folk tales having a similar name.

As one scholar asked:

Was Parasceve, or Paraskeva, an early Christian maiden named in honor of the day of the Crucifixion? Or was she a personification of that day, pictured cross in hand to assist the fervor of the faithful? And was the Paraskeva of the South Slavs the same who made her appearance in northern Russia?

3rd-century virgin martyr, Paraskevi of Iconium (Paraskeva-Pyatnitsa), and the 10th-century Paraskeva of the Balkans, were conflated with that of a Slavic deity associated with Friday, alternatively known as Petka, Pyatnitsa, or Zhiva.

The veneration of Saint Paraskeva, also known as Saint Petka, began to spread in the 14th century from Bulgaria into the Romanian principalities of Wallachia and Moldavia.

=== Modern-day veneration in Romania ===
==== 1947 procession ====
A severe drought in 1946-47 affected Moldavia, adding to the misery left by the war. Metropolitan Justinian Marina permitted the first procession featuring the coffin containing the relics of Paraskeva, kept at Iaşi until then. The relics winded their way through the drought-deserted villages of Iaşi, Vaslui, Roman, Bacău, Putna, Neamţ, Baia and Botoşani Counties. The offerings collected on this occasion were distributed, based on Metropolitan Justinian's decisions, to orphans, widows, invalids, school cafeterias, churches under construction, and to monasteries in order to feed the sick, and old or feeble monks.

==== Annual Iași pilgrimage ====
Pilgrimage at the shrines located in the Metropolitan Cathedral of Iași has become one of the major religious events in Romania. Hundreds of thousands of pilgrims gather each year in Iași in the second weekend of October to commemorate Saint Parascheva, while the city itself established its Celebration Days at the same time.

== Hagiographies ==
In the 14th century, Bishop Euthymius of Tarnovo (1332–1402) wrote a notable biography of Paraskeva - "Hagiography of Saint Petka of Tarnovo". The bishop's work was inspired from the Greek vita of Saint Paraskeva of the Balkans, written by deacon Basilikos in 1150 on the request of the Patriarch of Constantinople, Nicholas IV Mouzelon. Hagiographies were also written by Metropolitan Mattheos of Mira in 1605, Metropolitan Varlaam of Moldavia in 1643, Nikodimos the Athonite (19th century), and Romanian bishop Melchisedec of Roman in 1889. Some modern Romanian theologians published studies about Paraskeva: Gheorghe Păvăloiu (1935), Arhimandrite Varahil Jitaru (1942), D. Stănescu (1938), M. Țesan (1955), Scarlat Porcescu, and Mircea Păcurariu.

== Dedicated churches ==
=== Birthplace church in Epivates ===
A church dedicated to her was built in Epivates (present-day Selimpaşa) on the spot where her house of birth once stood. The oldest testimony regarding the church - written by the Russian traveller Anthony of Novgorod (who later became Archbishop of Novgorod) - dates back to the early-13th century. In August 1817 a great fire completely destroyed the church; it was rebuilt in 1820 with the financial support of the citizens of Constantinople and of the former Prince of Moldo-Wallahia, Alexander Kallimachi. In 1885 the Community demolished the old church in order to construct a much bigger one on the same site. The building, completed after 6 years, re-used parts of the 1327–1341 Byzantine tower of Duke Alexis Apokaukos as building material. It was the biggest church in the whole of Eastern Thrace (16 m in height, 26 m in width and 30 m in length), a real jewel that could be seen from kilometres away. It was completely demolished in the spring of 1979; a park occupies the site.

=== Extant notable churches ===
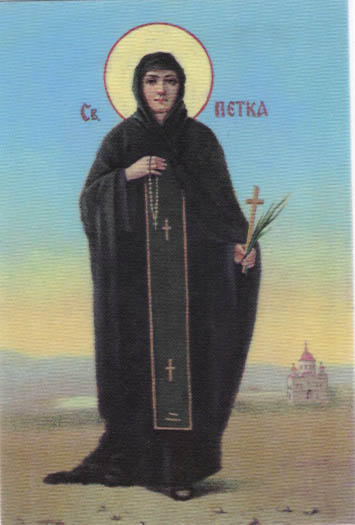
Saint Paraskeva on a Serbian Orthodox icon with church in the background

Worldwide, there are many churches named in honour of or dedicated to St Paraskeva. Some of the more notable include:

- Metropolitan Cathedral, Iași, Romania
- Church of St Paraskeva, Nesebar, Bulgaria
- Church of St Petka of the Saddlers, Sofia, Bulgaria
- Church of St Petka, Vukovo, Bulgaria
- Church of Sv. Petka, Crniche, Skopje, North Macedonia
- Church of Saint Parascheva, Slabinja, Croatia
- St. Petka's Church, Banovci, Croatia
- St Petka Chapel at Kalemegdan, Belgrade, Serbia
- St Petka's Church in Urovci, Obrenovac, Belgrade, Serbia
- Church of St Parascheva, Cotnari, Iași County, Romania
