= Ružica Church =

Church in Belgrade, Serbia

Coordinates: 44.8255°N 20.4513°E

Ružica (Little Rose)
- Ружица
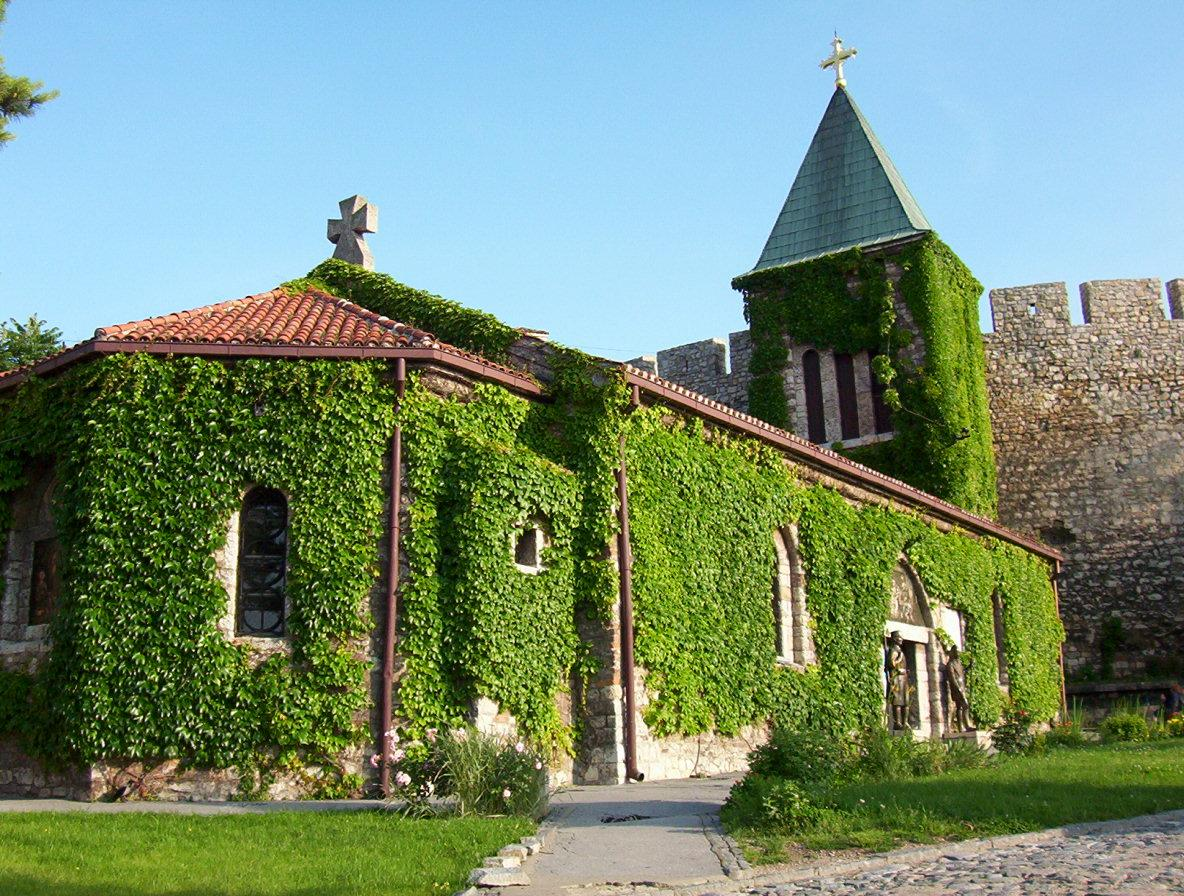
- Ružica Church, with façade covered in ivy

Religion
- Affiliation: Serbian Orthodox
- District: Archbishopric of Belgrade and Karlovci
- Leadership: Serbian Orthodox Church
- Year consecrated: 1925

Location
- Location: Belgrade, Serbia
- Interactive map of Ružica (Little Rose)

Architecture
- Completed: 1403 (demolished 1521); 1869 (demolished 1915); 1925

Ružica Church (Serbian Cyrillic: Црква Ружица, romanized: Crkva Ružica, lit. ''Little Rose Church'') is a Serbian Orthodox church located in the Belgrade Fortress, in Belgrade, the capital of Serbia. The original church was built in the early 15th century. It was remodelled in 1869 and fully reconstructed in 1925. It is dedicated to the Nativity of Mary. With its location within the fortress near the water spring of Saint Petka, constant crowds of visitors come - especially on Saint Petka's feast day. It is considered one of the "best loved churches among the faithful".

== Location ==
The church is located in the eastern outer bailey of the fortress, between the Zindan Gate's northern arched tower wall on the south, and Jakšić Tower on the north, both towering above the church. It is situated along the downhill, partially stepped path, which connects the Upper Town of the fortress (section between the Zindan and Leopold's gates) and the Lower Town. Along the path, just to the southeast, is Belgrade Planetarium, while the path continues to the Nebojša Tower and the Sava bank.

== History ==
=== Predecessor ===
The origin of the church is obscured. The church probably existed in the medieval period, during Despot Stefan Lazarević's reign in Belgrade (1402–1427), but the exact circumstances about its construction - when it was built and by whom - are unknown. Though today sometimes named as the oldest preserved church in Belgrade, it is not known whether despot Stefan built a new church, reconstructed the existing ruin, nor where the church was located. As a result, several myths about its origins developed. According to one, three sisters, Ružica, Cveta and Marica, built three churches within the fortress complex and each was named after one of the sisters. Urban myth developed by which the residents of Dorćol, Belgrade's neighborhood which leans on the fortress complex, claimed that the remains of one of those three churches can still be observed from the river level. Allegedly, the remains are right under the northern outer bailey, in the central section of the slope between the Defterdar Gate and Nebojša Tower.

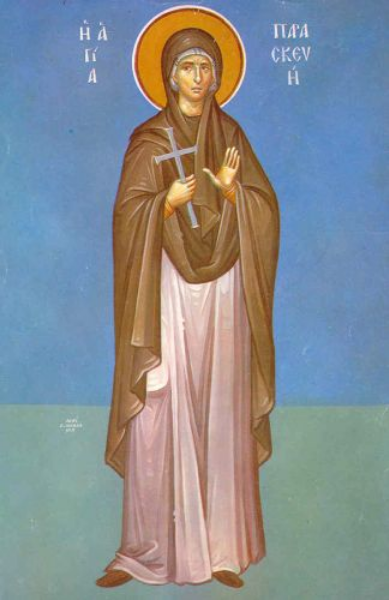
Saint Petka, whose remains rested in the original church from 1403 to 1521

Another origin story, described by Gregory Tsamblak in the 15th century, place construction of the church in 1403. Princess Milica and nun Jefimija pleaded to the Ottoman Sultan Bayezid I, also Milica's son-in-law, who eventually granted the permission for the remains of the Saint Petka to be transferred to Serbia before his loss of throne in 1402 probably granting it in 1396. Via Vidin, Bulgaria, the remains reached Belgrade in 1403. According to folk legend, wherever the caravan was stopping, the miraculous, healing water springs would appear. Above one of the springs in the fortress, at the location of modern church, the chapel and the church were built. The church was dedicated to the Mary, mother of Jesus, and the water from the spring flew under its foundations.

The remains of Saint Petka remained in Belgrade until 1521, kept in the rock above the spring. When the Ottomans conquered the city that year, his remains were transferred to Iași in Moldavia (modern Romania) and the church was demolished. Two of Saint Petka's fingers are kept in the modern Ružica Church as its most valuable relic. The cult of Saint Petka the healer was strong such that members of all confessions (Orthodox, Catholics, Muslims) made a pilgrimage to the spring named after him in the fortress, which was believed to heal blindness. What survived of the church and the chapel was demolished by the Ottomans in the late 17th century.

=== Origin ===
During their 1718-1739 occupation of Belgrade and northern Serbia, the Austrians built a gunpowder magazine next to the spring. It was part of the 1723-1739 Baroque reconstruction of the fortress, and the entire city outside the ramparts, conducted by Nicolas Doxat. Though obliged by the treaty to demolish everything that was built within the fortress during their occupation, the Austrians didn't destroy the magazine which remained as one of the rare object that survived. The Ottomans continued to use it for the same purpose.

During his first reign, prince Miloš Obrenović referred to the church in his correspondence with the Belgrade's Yusuf Pasha. When pasha asked for Miloš to repair the damaged minaret of the Batal Mosque in Belgrade, prince responded that "within the ramparts there are two churches, where the Turks keep their ammunition, but they don't allow the Serbs to repair them". The location was strongly embedded into the collective folk remembrance at the time, due to its alleged ancient origins and miraculous spring of Saint Petka. The myth surrounding the church especially developed in the 19th century, when population believed that Turks adapted the ancient church into the gunpowder magazine. Only 5 days after the Ottomans were fully expelled from the Belgrade Fortress on 18 April [O.S. 6 April] 1867, and on the day when Serbian army entered the fortress, Metropolitan of Belgrade Mihailo Jovanović asked that Serbian government hands over the object to the church for the reconstruction. The board for the reconstruction of the church was founded on 5 May [O.S. 23 April] 1867 and donations collection began.

After the works on adaptation of the magazine began, they were finished in 9 months. The consecration was held on 3 January 1868 [O.S. 22 December 1867], by Metropolitan Mihailo. He compared the "resurrection" of the church with the biblical Raising of Lazarus. The regular service began by the spring of 1869 when the bell tower was completed. The altar was roofed in September 1869. The first bell was placed in October 1870. As the fortress was largely a military facility, Ružica was dedicated as the military church.

=== Modern church ===
The church was heavily damaged during World War I and suffered constant bombardment of the fortress by the Austro-Hungarian forces from across the Sava. It was almost completely demolished in 1915 and was also plundered by the Austro-Hungarian and German soldiers. The altar and the bell tower were damaged the most. Being a garrison church, a Holy Communion for some 1,000 soldiers, defenders of Belgrade, was held in Ružica in 1914, when Austrians attacked for the first time, and in 1915, when they attacked again. The soldiers were holding positions in the trenches below the church where most of them were killed. In October 1915, a grenade fired from the 42 cm Gamma Mörser hit the fortress wall right above the church but didn't explode. Church was badly damaged by this time and if the grenade exploded (cartridge weighted 900 kg (2,000 lb) and contained 96 kg (212 lb) of TNT), it would destroy the wall of the Zindan Gate tower which was hit and would level the church to the ground as it is located below the wall. Still, the bell tower was destroyed and the entire apsidal side of the church was completely demolished.

At the location of the modern Monument of Gratitude to France in Kalemegdan section of the fortress, there was a monument to Karađorđe, dedicated on 21 August 1913. During the Austro-Hungarian occupation, the Austrians planned to erect the bronze monument to their emperor, Franz Joseph I on that very spot so they melted the Karađorđe's monument to reuse the bronze. When the Franz Joseph monument was being shipped to Belgrade in 1918, Serbian forces captured the ship and confiscated the statue. It was later melted into three church bells, largest of which still tolls from the bell tower of the Ružica Church today.

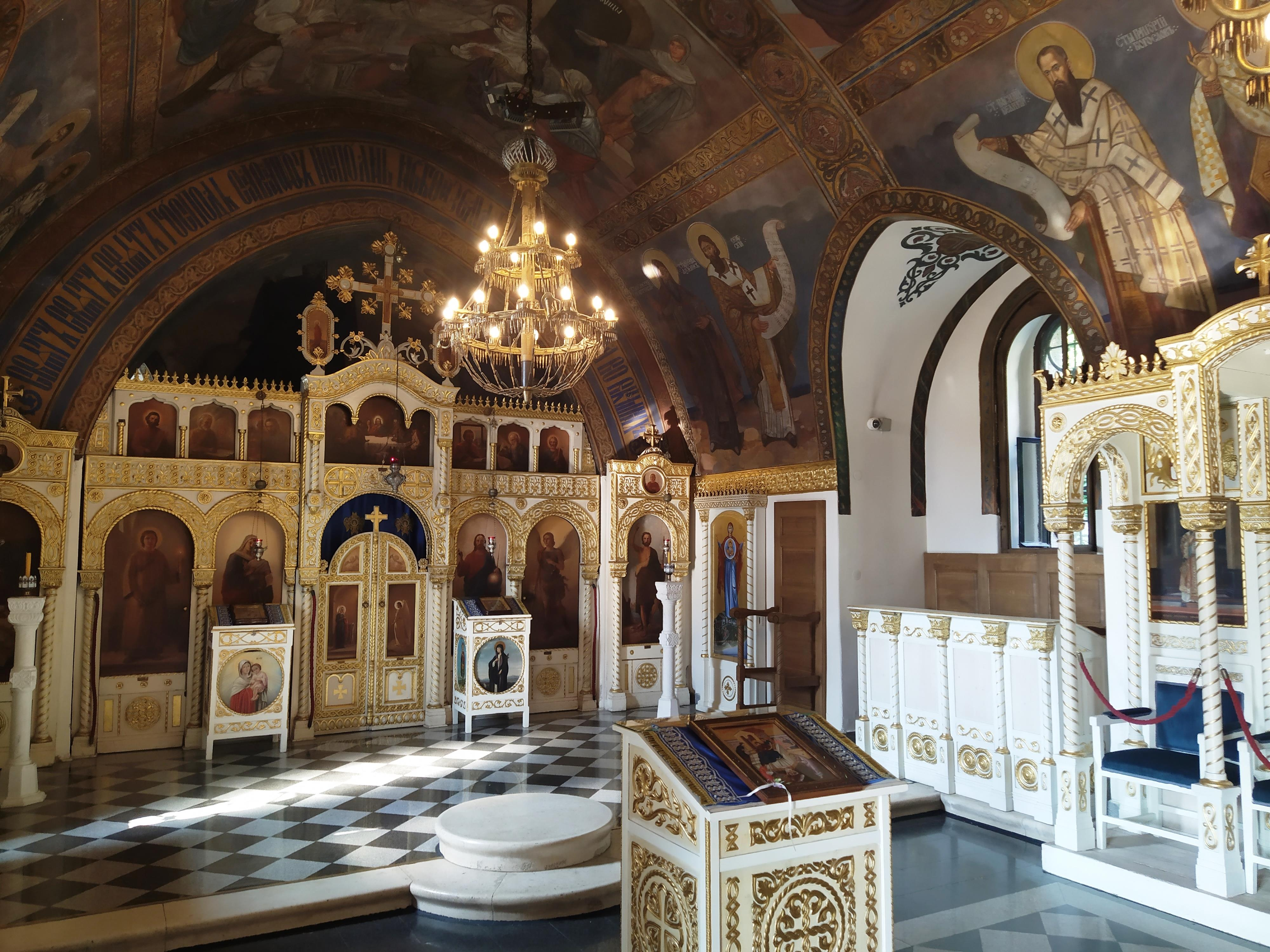
Interior of the church

Reconstruction, after the design by the Russian émigré architect Nikolay Krasnov, lasted from 1921 to 1925, and the reconstructed Ružica Church was consecrated on 11 October 1925. A memorial plaque, commemorating this event, but also the destruction during the war, was placed on the church wall. The building wasn't expanded but the new bell tower was completely different from the previous one. The church lost the façade mortar and Krasnov decided not to restore it. This made the stone, from which the church is made, exposed which gave it the rustic appearance and the object blended better into the surroundings of the stone fortress.

The reconstruction was headed by the new board for the reconstruction and heftily helped by the Ministry of war. The Military Technical Institute in Kragujevac cast two large polyeleos chandeliers, three large candelabra and the relief-type icons made of metal. They were all made of melted military materials: rifle and pistol bullets, shell cases and sabres. They are unique among the church equipment because of this and enhanced the military allegiance of the object.

During the 1925 reconstruction, two statues were sculptured. One represents the lancer from the period of Emperor Dušan, while the other one is of an infantry soldier from the Balkan Wars period. The statues are placed on the sides of the main entrance. The white, memorial plaque was placed above the statue of the medieval knight. Krasnov especially designed the side portal where these statues are placed, so as the bronze icon of the Mother of God. The two sculptures were also made of remaining war materials. Six icons were brought from the Serbian military camp in Nador, Morocco, but only two are preserved today. The iconostasis was carved by Kosta Todorović, and the icons were painted by Rafailo Momčilović. The walls were covered in paintings by Andrej Bicenko, another Russian émigré artist, who finished his work in 1938.

In 1926, the unexploded grenade above the church was deactivated and removed. Newspapers reported about the event on daily basis, and when the grenade was taken out, it was publicly announced that the fortress is safe for the visitors. The grenade is today exhibited in the Military Museum, on the top of the fortress. Also, works on the complex continued after 1925, when the waterworks pipes were conducted and the altar gate was placed. Works were finished by 1937, when the Chapel of Saint Petka, the porch and the clergy house were completed. They were all designed by the architect Momir Korunović. Still, many believe that the chapel is older than the church. Small niche, which surrounded the walled spring before the proper chapel was finished, used to be called Zemun's Chapel, though the reason for this name is not known.

It was during this works that an ossuary of the World War I defenders of Belgrade was built within the lower walls of the Jakšić Tower, right next to the religious complex. There was a larger ossuary next to it, where the staircase connected the church plateau with the higher section of the fortress. From 1931 to 1937, the remains of 3,529 identified, and 1,074 initially unidentified soldiers were reinterred at the Belgrade New Cemetery. After the Belgrade Zoo was opened in 1936 under the former larger ossuary, the restaurant "Kalemegdan Terrace" was opened on top of the rampart. After the war, in the late 1940s, the restaurant expanded inside the tower. The restaurant, under its original name, so as the staircase to the church, still exist.

A smaller number of Dorćol's residents considered Ružica their parochial church, even though it was officially a military church. However, during World War II, the church was closed. German occupational forces took over the fortress and re-militarized it. Collaborationist administration invited priests and adherents to continue using the church, and to "keep it alive", but the residents refused. The clergy house was demolished during the massive Allied Easter bombing in April 1944.

Only after World War II, with the new Communist government, Ružica stopped being military and garrison church, and worship services began to be conducted by the monastics and priests of the Patriarchate and the Eparchy of Belgrade-Karlovci. Serbian Orthodox Church set an unofficial rule that the services and sermons in the Ružica were held by the professors from the Belgrade's Saint Sava Seminary. The Ružica church is served by male priests, while the Saint Petka's chapel is served by nuns.

The church, and the fortress' Kalemegdan Park, are still traditionally visited by children on Lazarus Saturday, which is among Serbs considered a children's feast. It is also known as Vrbica, cause young branches of willow (Serbian vrba, vrbica meaning "young willow") are picked, and children are given small bells. During the rigid Communist period after World War II, a local raion committee fired the headmistress of a kindergarten at the corner of the Dušanova and Tadeuša Košćuška streets, right across the park, and issued monetary fines to the teachers, cause they organized children to visit the church.

== Artwork ==
Momčilović painted the icons on the iconostasis using technique oil on plywood, after the sketches of bishop Irinej Đurić. Todorović carved the bulkheads of the iconostasis in the shallow, gold plated wood engraving to recreate the medieval Serbian Morava style. Bicenko's wall paintings are specific, as they contain images of certain contemporaries. Western section represents Jesus Christ's Sermon on the Mount, with priest Petar Trbojević and King Alexander in the audience. In the eastern section there are images of King Peter and Emperor Nicholas II of Russia. Due to high moisture levels, the iconography is mostly damaged today.

Professor Đuro Radlović worked on mosaics. He finished the New Testament's concept of Holy Trinity in 1976 but was the first to depict it differently from previous portrayals. Instead of placing it in church's nave, he put it on one of the ceilings. On one side of the arch is a representation of God the Father, one the other side is Jesus Christ, while the Holy Spirit is in the middle. The golden rays emanating from him, connect it to God and Christ, forming a physical trinity.

== Sources ==
- "Православље - Цркве Ружица и Света Петка". Archived from the original on 1 November 2012.
