= Mihai Iștvanovici =

Romanian typographer working in Georgia

- Born: c. 1650; Alba Iulia, Principality of Transylvania, or Wallachia
- Died: after 1713 (aged 63 or older); Wallachia, Habsburg Transylvania, or County of Holland
- Occupations: Typographer; clergyman; poet

Mihai or Mihail Iștvanovici (Cyrillic: Мiхаи Iщвановичь, Georgian: მიხაი იშტვანოვიჩი, romanized: mikhai isht'vanovichi, Hungarian: Istvánovics Mihály), also known as Ișvanovici, Iștanovici, Ștefanovici or Stepaneshvili (სტეფანეშვილი; fl. 1650–1713), was a Wallachian typographer, letter cutter, typeface designer, Eastern Orthodox clergyman and poet, mainly noted for his work in the Kingdom of Kartli (modern-day Georgia). His early life is entirely obscure, but possibly tied to the Transylvanian Principality, and his surname has been read by some authors as indicative of a more or less distant Hungarian origin—though his presumed father was a Serb. His debut as a printer was registered at Snagov Monastery, outside the Wallachian capital of Bucharest, but in 1699 he was active at Alba Iulia in Transylvania. Sent there by the Wallachian prince Constantin Brâncoveanu, who reinforced links with the Transylvanian Romanians, Iștvanovici put out the first-ever textbook in the Romanian language. He disappeared from Transylvanian records soon after, possibly due to increased pressures for a communion with Rome—which Brâncoveanu and Iștvanovici opposed.

In 1706, Iștvanovici was at Râmnicu Vâlcea, a printer and a subdeacon in service to the Wallachian Orthodox Metropolis. He had direct access to Metropolitan Anthim the Iberian, who was himself an engraver and printer; when Kartlian King Vakhtang VI asked for an expert typographer, Anthim selected Iștvanovici. The latter went on to establish the first printing press in Tbilisi and all of Georgia, which is traditionally dated to October 1709, and, alongside a group of Georgian or Romanian "servants", printed books using Georgian letters of his own design; his 1709 version of the Gospel includes a Romanian poem in Georgian script. Iștvanovici accomplished these feats in only three years, after which he left for the County of Holland, where he was to undergo further training. Scholars propose that he either died there, or that he returned to spend his later life in either Wallachia or Transylvania.

== Biography ==
=== Origins and related disputes ===
According to a 1699 record in his own hand, the printer was a Wallachian subject. His surname Iștvanovici, later Georgianized as "Stepaneshvili", was in fact a patronymic, indicating that his father was named Stephen (Ștefan in Romanian, István in Hungarian). Historian and designer György Haiman suggests that the spelling Iștvanovici, which is unusual in Romanian, may attest that the family had Hungarian origins, but had moved to Wallachia "at one time". Another scholar, Vano Imelishvili, similarly described him and Miklós Tótfalusi Kis as "Hungarian printers" with similar roles in the development of Georgian type. In his 1986 book of travels, Eugen Lumezianu proposed that Iștvanovici was a Hungarian, though his stance on this issue was deplored by literary critic Theodor Codreanu.

Several authors have traditionally argued that Mihai's birthplace was in the Transylvanian Principality (Hungarian-ruled, and located to the north of Wallachia). In 1915, scholar Nicolae Iorga surmised that Mihai was a member of the Romanian-speaking corps within Hungarian nobility, with his origins in "Fogaras". Another researcher, Alexandru Ligor, proposes the same Transylvanian-origin theory, but notes that his apprenticeship was completed at Snagov, in southern Wallachia. Art historian Cornel Tatai-Baltă hypothesizes that Mihai's father was a printer from the Transylvanian capital of Alba Iulia, who had contributed to a version of the Gospel. Historian and bibliophile Pál Binder wrote in 1974 that Ștefan, who "we are led to believe, is the father of the famous printer Mihail", was a Wallachian Serb ultimately hailing from Ohrid. In her 1994 overview of Romanian scholarship, Judit Ecsedy validated this account, including the Serb origin, and located Iștvanovici's birthplace in Alba Iulia. She further remarks a consensus among Romanian historians, namely that Mihai was born between 1648 and 1651.

Print of Saints Constantine and Helena, as used by Iștvanovici in the various editions of 1696–1699

The young man had some training in languages, and was able to read and write in Greek. Historian Onisifor Ghibu was not aware of any documents regarding Iștvanovici's schooling, simply noting that, by 1699, he appeared to have been "outstandingly competent and endowed with a churchly culture that is rare among printers" (din cale afară de iscusit și înzestrat cu o cultură bisericească neobișnuită la alți tipografi). According to Ecsedy, Iștvanovici first took up printing in Bucharest with the Georgian-born carver, Anthim the Iberian, who was also a religious scholar. Iștvanovici's contribution at Snagov includes a liturgy for the Feast of Constantine and Helen, with an engraved image of the two saints that he later reused in his Transylvanian books. The item was closely modeled on a fresco inside Bucharest's Metropolitan Church. Overseen by Anthim, who was Snagov's Hegumen (and whose skills, Ecsedy notes, were closely replicated by the younger apprentice), the liturgy was completed on 6 February 1696. Medievalist Ivan Biliarsky records the work as Iștvanovici's personal gift to the reigning Wallachian Prince, Constantin Brâncoveanu, containing his "eulogy for the sovereign and his power."

=== Transylvanian career ===
Soon after this milestone in his career, Iștvanovici settled in Alba Iulia. As literary historian Gabriel Ștrempel notes, this was in 1697, explaining why the printing activity at Snagov was greatly reduced beginning that year. Brâncoveanu was seeking to contain the spread of Eastern Catholicism among Romanians. The threat against the very existence of a Transylvanian Orthodox Metropolis had been rendered acute with the region's conquest by the Habsburg monarchy, ending the Great Turkish War. As argued by historian Nicolae Cartojan, Iștvanovici and David Corbea were sent in not just to print books, but also to "revise [them] in the Orthodox sense". Ecsedy adds that Iștvanovici was called upon because the Orthodox master printer of Alba Iulia, Chiriac Moldoveanul, had died in or around 1696.

In 1699, Iștvanovici put out a Transylvanian Chiriacodromion and Bucoavnă. The latter appeared in summer, and was partly sponsored by magistrate István Kisfaludi. It was also the first-ever textbook to be published in the Romanian language. Researchers such as Ghibu note its close resemblance to earlier primers and catechisms in Church Slavonic, and believe that Iștvanovici himself may have translated and reproduced these models. Specifically, Ghibu highlights the similarities between Bucoavnă and Meletius Smotrytsky's book of grammar, Грамматіки славєнскиѧ правилноє Сvнтаґма, noting its linguistic and "markedly Orthodox" ideological purism: "it has not one trait in common with Western didactic literature." Himself an Eastern Catholic Protopope, Grigore Silași saw Bucoavnă as making a point of repeating its commitment to Orthodoxy, concluding that Metropolitan Atanasie Anghel felt himself pressured by adversaries of his "poor Romanian nation". This generic line is contradicted on one point by the anomalous sampling of the Athanasian Creed, which was generally shunned by many Eastern Orthodox theologians—though, as Ghibu notes, it had already been reproduced in Slavonic primers, and had been at least partly endorsed by the catechist Petro Mohyla in the 17th century. In noting this trait, Ghibu explicitly contradicts earlier commentators, including Iorga and Aron Densușianu, who had read Bucoavnă as a sample of semi-Catholic literature.

Chiriacodromion appeared as an updated version of Varlaam Moțoc's Homiliary, with the specification: tipărită mai luminat în limba românească ("printed in a more enlightened Romanian language"). As Iștvanovici attests in his preface to it, he had been invited by the local Romanian Orthodox community, with blessings from Brâncoveanu. He also notes that this was because "there being at this time no artisan trained in the art of typography for our Romanian kin, here in Transylvania" (neîntâmplându-se de această dată neamului nostru românesc, aici în Ardeal, meșter pentru lucrul tipografiei). As he asserts therein, Brâncoveanu was patronușul cel adevărat al Sfintei Mitropolii [a Ardealului] ("the real-life patron of the Holy Metropolis [of Transylvania]"). The work became widely circulated among Romanians in both Transylvania and the Habsburg Kingdom of Hungary, with copies reaching Gyula and Apateu. Slavist Dan Horia Mazilu proposes that there were only "insignificant additions" to Varlaam's text, which was found useful for a "a Romaniandom now 'under pressure' from Catholicism".

No other Transylvanian books appeared with Iștvanovici credited as a printer. The reason for his apparent absence is unknown, but scholar L. Rus proposes that he may have been dragged into a conflict with the church leadership, at a time when Metropolitan Atanasie and other Transylvanian clergymen were increasingly accepting of communion with Rome. Ghibu also writes that, "in 1700, once the union [of churches] had been sealed, [and] understanding that there was no reason for him to carry on in Transylvania, he made his way back to Wallachia". A similar explanation is provided by Ecsedy. As she notes, the cause of Orthodoxy "seemed hopeless in 1699. Due to political developments, it was not possible to publish further Orthodox literature in Cyrillic. [Brâncoveanu] had no interest in supporting publications prepared in the spirit of the union with the Catholics, so Istvanovics was presumably recalled."

Instead, the printing press of Alba Iulia, now serving Atanasie's Eastern Catholic eparchy, proceeded with prints of Pál Baranyai's Jesuit catechism, Pânea pruncilor. Some scholars, including Ion Mușlea, regard this as Iștvanovici's final, unsigned, contribution to Transylvanian printing—noting the usage of his patented ornaments and typefaces. Authors such as Ghibu and Eugen Pavel propose that it is impossible for Iștvanovici to have submitted to Catholicism, and suggest that his work was used without his permission; Ecsedy supports their view, crediting master Nicolai as the printer. It is also known that the Jesuits were openly hostile to Iștvanovici: in 1701, Gábor Kapi, on behalf of the Jesuit order, informed Cardinal von Kollonitsch that Bucoavnă was a book incompatible with Catholic teachings.

=== Râmnicu Vâlcea, Kartli, and Holland ===
Unsigned engraving of Vakhtang VI in Iștvanovici's 1709 Gospel

Iștvanovici's return to Wallachia is tentatively dated to 1702 or 1703. He became active with the printing press in Râmnicu Vâlcea (according to Ghibu, he was its founder), putting out some six books in 1706–1707, and also being ordained as a subdeacon by the Wallachian Metropolis. It was in Râmnicu Vâlcea that, in 1706, he published a blason (Stihuri politice) dedicated to Brâncoveanu and referencing the coat of arms of Wallachia. This and other such fragments are seen by Ecsedy as samples of a baroque strand in Romanian literature, on par with poetry by Udriște Năsturel and by Iștvanovici 's own master, Anthim. Ghibu notes that they were all "quite good". Iștvanovici had by then returned to working with and for Anthim. With the latter mostly caught up by his work as Bishop of Râmnic, he now handled the manual part of the part of the printing process. Also in 1706, he printed Anthim's Molitfelnic, which became the standard Romanian prayer-book. Its dedication includes a brief but culturally important record of Anthim's own arrival to Wallachia.

Anthim emerged as Wallachian Metropolitan in 1708, and Iștvanovici was personally selected by him to sail for Kartli, where King Vakhtang VI was trying to establish his own printing press. Imelishvili suggests that he arrived in Tbilisi in 1707 or 1708, though Ecsedy records his presence in Bucharest, "where he produced Greek-language prints" at around the same time. She proposes 1709 as the year of his departure. Upon arriving at Vakhtang's court, Iștvanovici had to create his own typeface of Georgian scripts, possibly using templates of Greek letters done by Robert Granjon in the 1560s (at least one of which he likely transported in from Wallachia, alongside woodcuts taken directly from Snagov and reused); upon the close of the 17th century, King Archil II had ordered Georgian typefaces in the West, from Miklós Tótfalusi Kis, but these never reached Tbilisi. The first Georgian book published by Iștvanovici is the 1709 Gospel (Sahareba), followed in 1710 by the Kondaki and in 1711 by the Davitni. As noted by Haiman: "Iștvanovici was an outstanding printer. Not only did he establish a print-shop, but also created a printing tradition in Georgia, where there was no such activity preceding him." Also according to Haiman, the one-time mention of his "servants" suggests that he also trained Georgians, or Romanian expatriates, in the art of letter-cutting. The Georgian Gospel includes a six-line sample of his Romanian lyrics—using a standard Wallachian format, but unusually printed in Georgian script.

Anthim was especially proud of his pupil's work in Tbilisi, explaining to Brâncoveanu that Georgia had been integrated into his evangelization program, which touched areas within and without the Ottoman Empire. However, only some ten titles were printed under Iștvanovici's direction. As attested in a 1713 letter by Anthim, he had left the Georgian realm in 1712, moving into the Tsardom of Russia and, from there, sailed to the County of Holland, where he was to further his skills. His presence in Holland is also mentioned by Ligor, who argues that was still introduced there as a Wallachian. A passing note by scholar Kristine Sharashidze suggests that he eventually resettled in Wallachia, but, as Haiman notes, no definitive records exist as to his later life and death. Ștrempel contrarily argues that "nobody can precisely tell" if Iștvanovici ever made it back from Holland, and suggests that no later record places him in either Kartli or Wallachia; likewise, Biliarsky posits that he never returned from his Dutch trip. Tatai-Baltă, who sees Iștvanovici's presence in Holland as merely "probable", does not rule out that he finally moved back to Alba Iulia. Binder believes that he most likely died in 1720.

== Legacy ==
Two lines from Iștvanovici's Romanian poem in Georgian script, added as a postface to the 1709 Gospel of Tbilisi

Ghibu opines that the Bucoavnă still had clandestine echoes after the Transylvanian passage to Catholicism—as seen in the emergence of Romanian Transylvanian primary schools in places such as Porcești (1702), Dridif (1725), and Poiana Sibiului (1733). The Hungarian-led Reformed Diocese of Transylvania also expressed interest in the book, which its librarian, József Almási, bought and preserved at the Reformed College in Koloswar (Cluj). From Georgia, Iștvanovici had sent samples of his Gospel not just to Wallachia (one of these copies was dedicated by Anthim to his liege Brâncoveanu), but also to the other Romanian-speaking principality, Moldavia, whose Princely Academy preserved a copy. The Tbilisi press, manned by his Georgian apprentices, only closed down in 1722.

According to Rus, Iștvanovici's activity in Kartli had been entirely forgotten by Romanians until the 1880s, when Caucasologist Frédéric Bayern informed Gheorghe I. Lahovary of his findings. Iștvanovici's contribution to fostering Georgia–Romania relations was celebrated during the Cold War, when the Romanian People's Republic and Soviet Georgia were part of the Eastern Bloc. In August 1958, a project for an Anthim and Iștvanovici biopic was announced as having been initiated by the Georgian Film Studio. In October of that year, Petre Constantinescu-Iași headed a Romanian cultural delegation invited in for the 250th anniversary of Tbilisi's printing press, which also celebrated Iștvanovici's work. The Wallachian contribution was again mentioned in an August 1961 speech by Vasil Mzhavanadze of the Georgian Communist Party, welcoming a panel of Romanian politicians on their extended visit to Tbilisi. Mzhavanadze, who dated Iștvanovici's arrival to 1703, also noted that his printing press allowed Georgians to publish Shota Rustaveli's national epic, The Knight in the Panther's Skin.
