= Nicoară =

Nicoară is a Romanian given name and a surname. Notable people with the surname include:

== Given name ==
- Nicoară Baltag, founder of the Nicoriță Church, Iași, Romania
- Nicoară Hâra (fl. 1541–1545), Moldavian high-ranking boyar
- Nicoară Potcoavă (died 1578), Cossack ataman, and short-time ruler of Moldavia

== Surname ==
- Marius Nicoară, Romanian politician
- Mona Nicoară, Romanian director and producer
- Teodora Nicoară, Romanian women's football defender
- Titus Nicoară (born 1988), Romanian basketball player
- Vasilie Nicoară, Romanian sprint canoeist
- Viorel Nicoară (born 1987), Romanian footballer
