= Cazania lui Varlaam =

1643 book edited by the Metropolitan of Moldavia Varlaam Moțoc

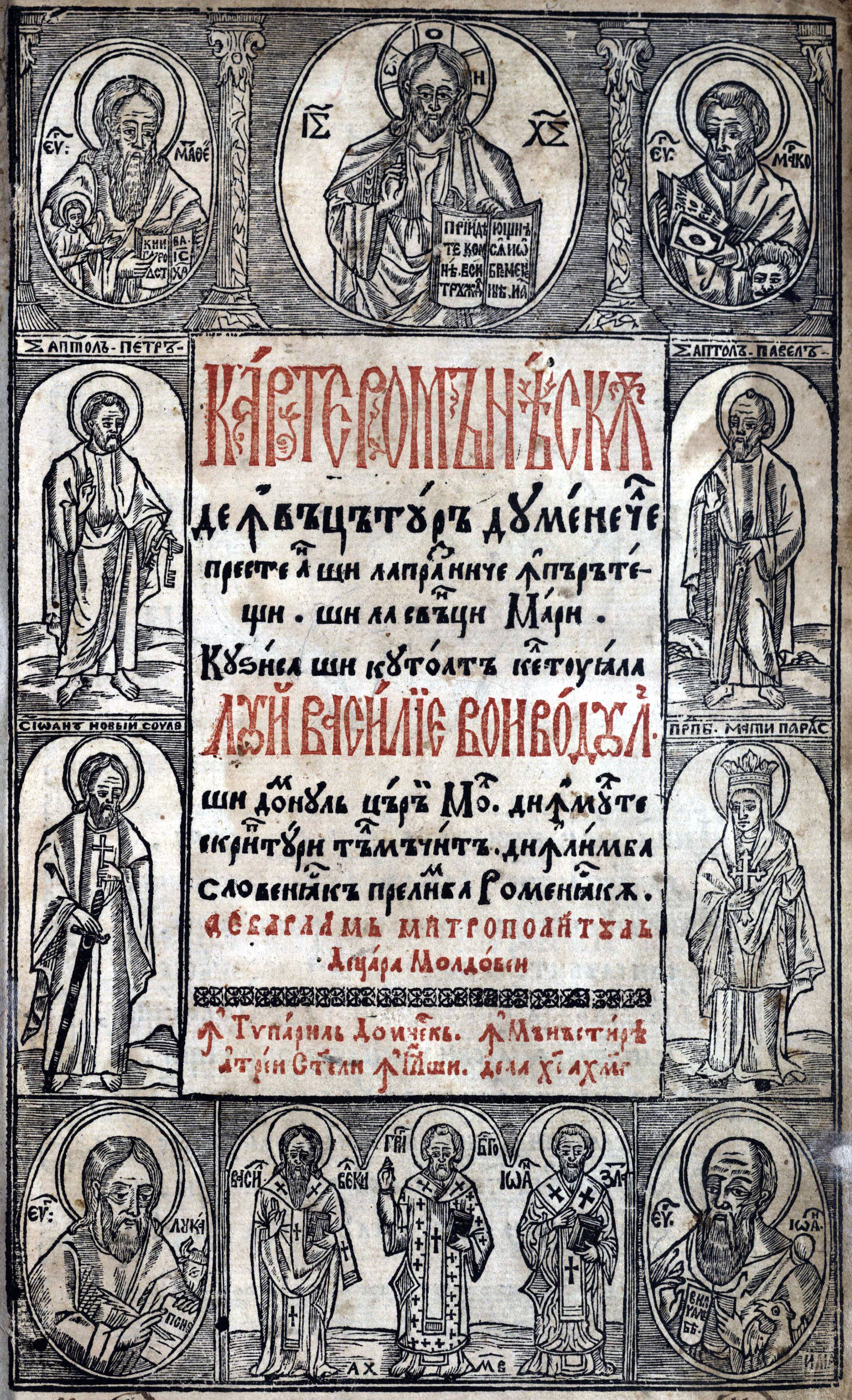
- Author: Varlaam Moțoc
- Original title: Carte Romănească de Învățătură
- Language: Romanian
- Publisher: Metropolitan of Moldavia, Iași
- Publication date: 1643
- Publication place: Principality of Moldavia
- Media type: Paper
- Followed by: Response to the Calvinist Catechism

Cazania lui Varlaam (the Homiliary of Varlaam) also known as Carte Romănească de Învățătură (the Romanian Book of Learning) is a book edited by the Metropolitan of Moldavia Varlaam Moțoc in 1643. It is a translation of the Books of Homilies from Slavonic into the Romanian language. It was the first book to be printed in Moldavia, under the patronage of the Prince Vasile Lupu.

== History ==
In 1643, the Moldavian Prince Vasile Lupu sponsored the Books of Homilies translated by Metropolitan of Moldavia Varlaam from Slavonic into Romanian (pre limba Romeniască) and titled Carte Românească de Învățătură (Romanian Book of Learning) .

The foreword by Prince Lupu says that it is addressed to the entire Romanian nation everywhere (la toată semenția românească de pretutindeni). The book, also known as Cazania lui Varlaam ("The Cazania of Varlaam" or "Varlaam's Homiliary"), was the very first printed in Moldavia and large numbers of copies spread in the neighboring provinces inhabited by Romanian speakers.

== See also ==
- Carte Românească de Învățătură
