= Antim Monastery =

Romanian Orthodox church in Bucharest, Romania

- Mănăstirea Antim
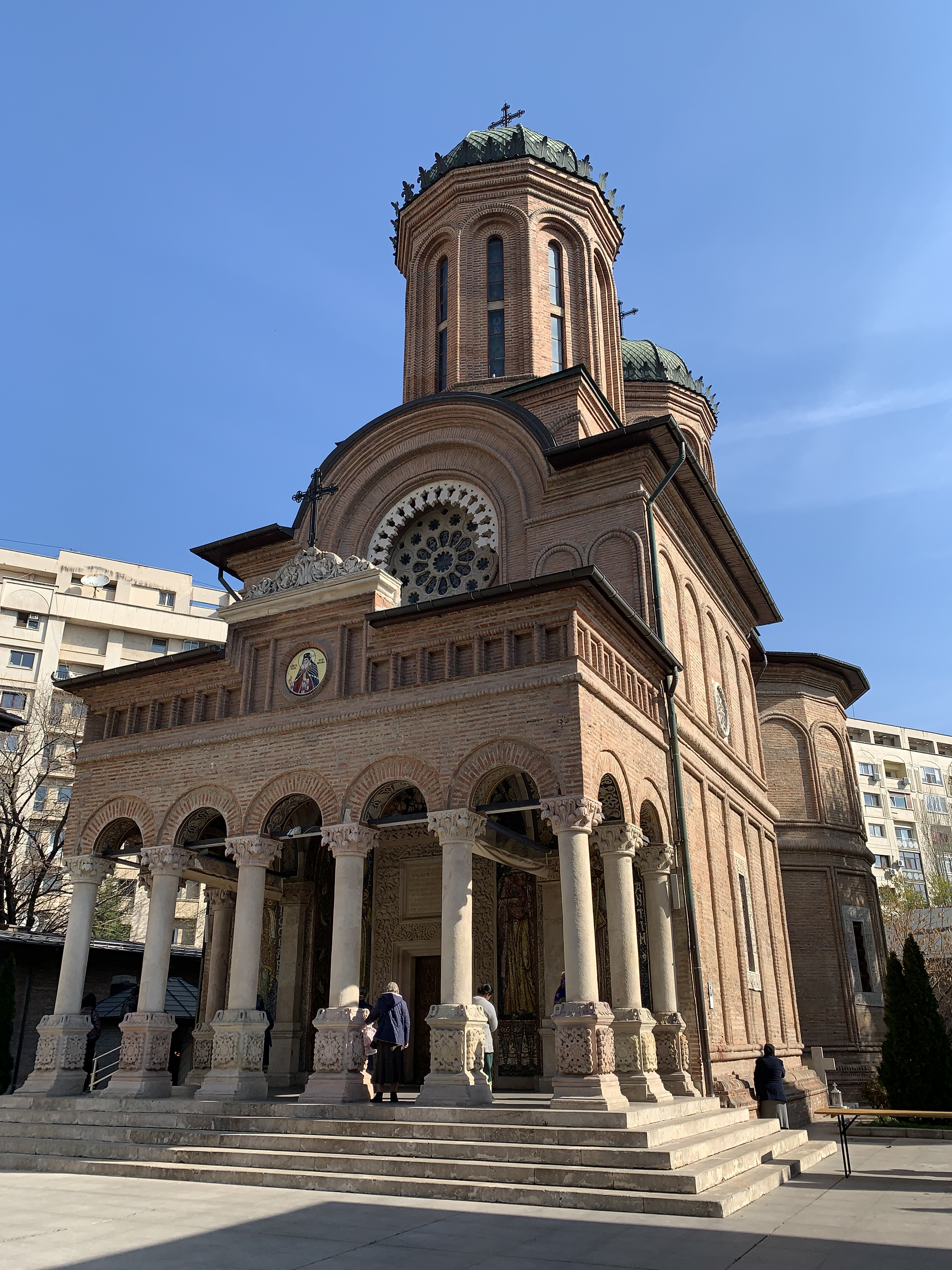
- The church building of Antim Monastery

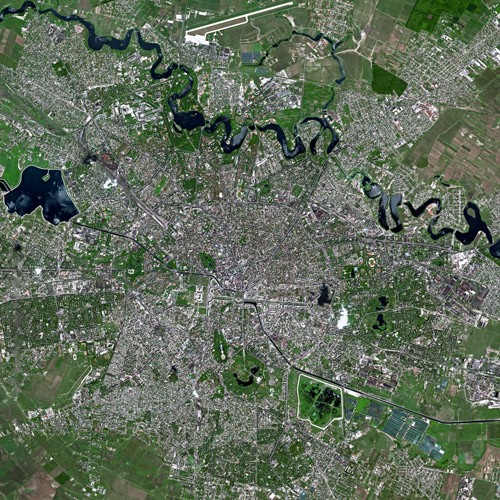
- Location within Bucharest, Romania

Religion
- Affiliation: Romanian Orthodox Church
- Year consecrated: 1715

Location
- Location: Bucharest
- Country: Romania
- Interactive map of Antim Monastery
- Coordinates: 44°25′34.64″N 26°5′37.69″E

Architecture
- Founder: Anthim the Iberian
- Groundbreaking: 1713
- Completed: 1715

The Antim Monastery (Romanian: Mănăstirea Antim) is a Romanian Orthodox church located in Bucharest, Romania on Mitropolit Antim Ivireanu Street, no. 29. It was built between 1713 and 1715 by Saint Anthim the Iberian, at that time a Metropolitan Bishop of Wallachia. The buildings were restored by Patriarch Justinian Marina in the 1960s. As of 2005, there were 7 monks living in the Monastery. The monastery also hosts a museum with religious objects and facts about the life of Anthim the Iberian.

The Monastery is connected to the Legionnaires' rebellion and Bucharest pogrom. On January 22, 1941, led by Hieromonk Nicodem Ioniță, the monks of Antim armed themselves and, using explosives, blew up a synagogue on Antim Street. The numerous Jewish inhabitants of the neighborhood hid in terror. Some of the monks involved were graduates of the Cernica Seminary, a Legionary stronghold.

During the communist rule of Nicolae Ceaușescu, the government threatened demolition of the church and many other historic structures in Romania. A project organized by engineer Eugeniu Iordăchescu moved the church to a different nearby site and saved it in time.

== Gallery ==
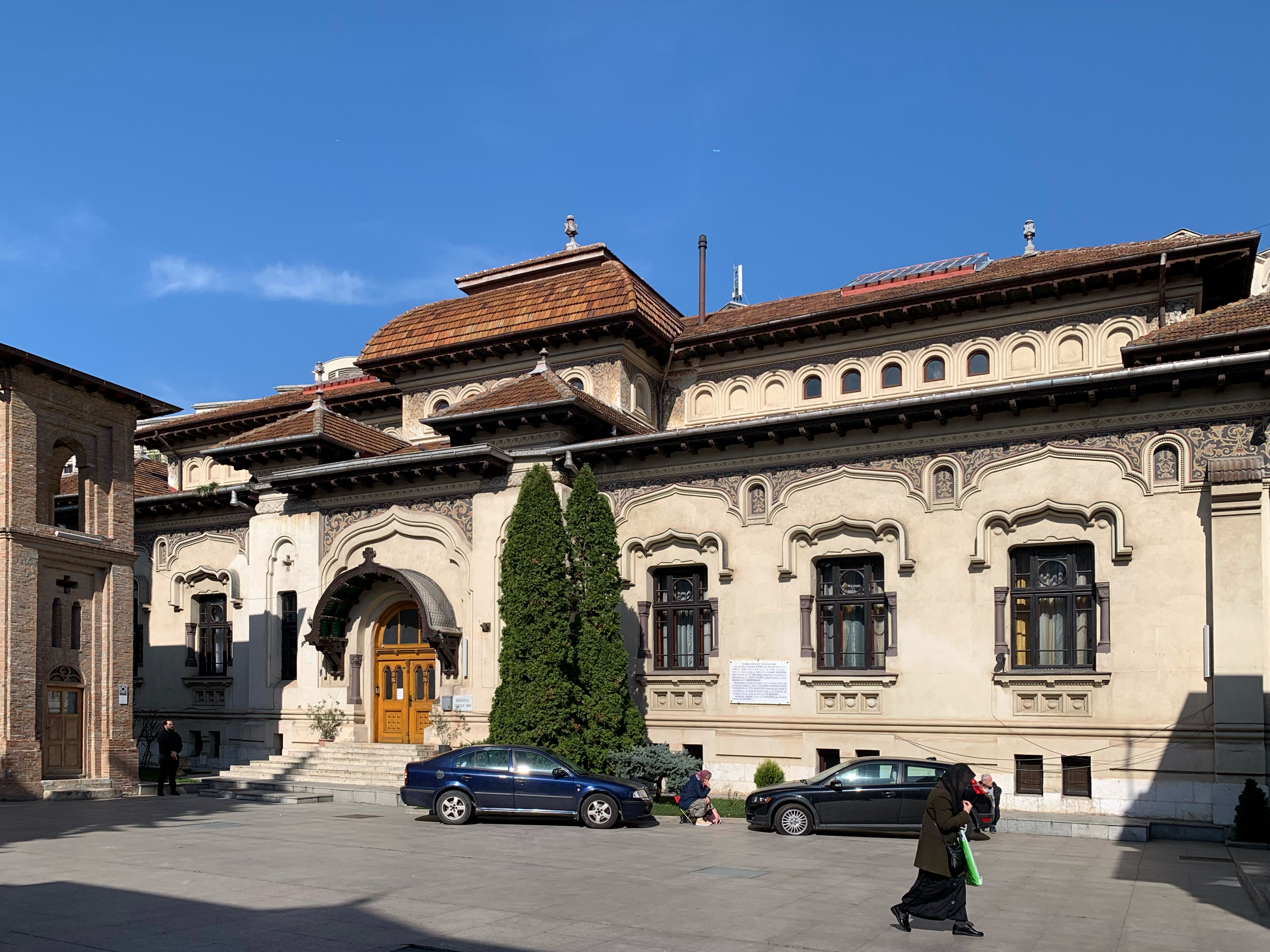
Palace of the Holy Synod Library

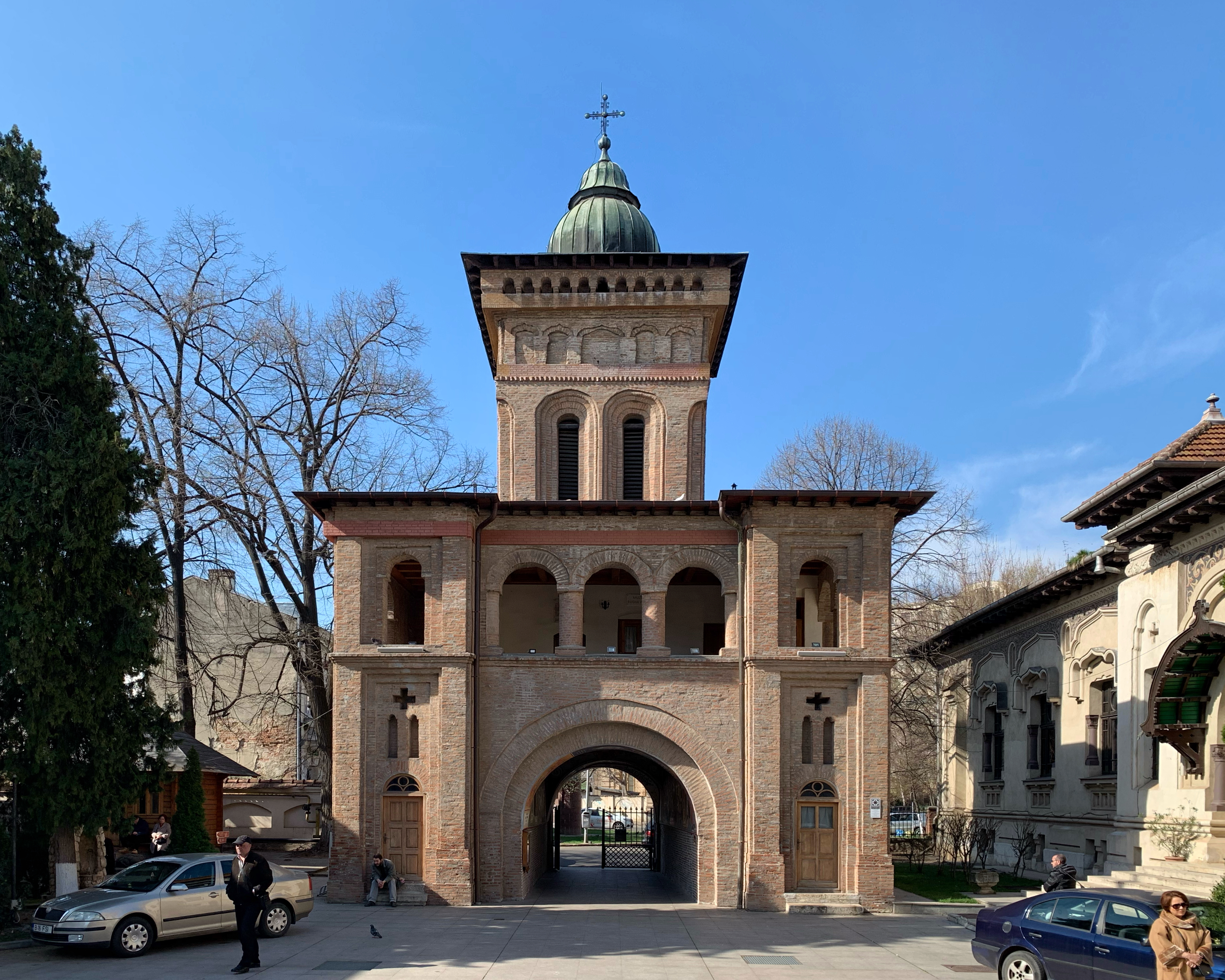
The belfry entrance

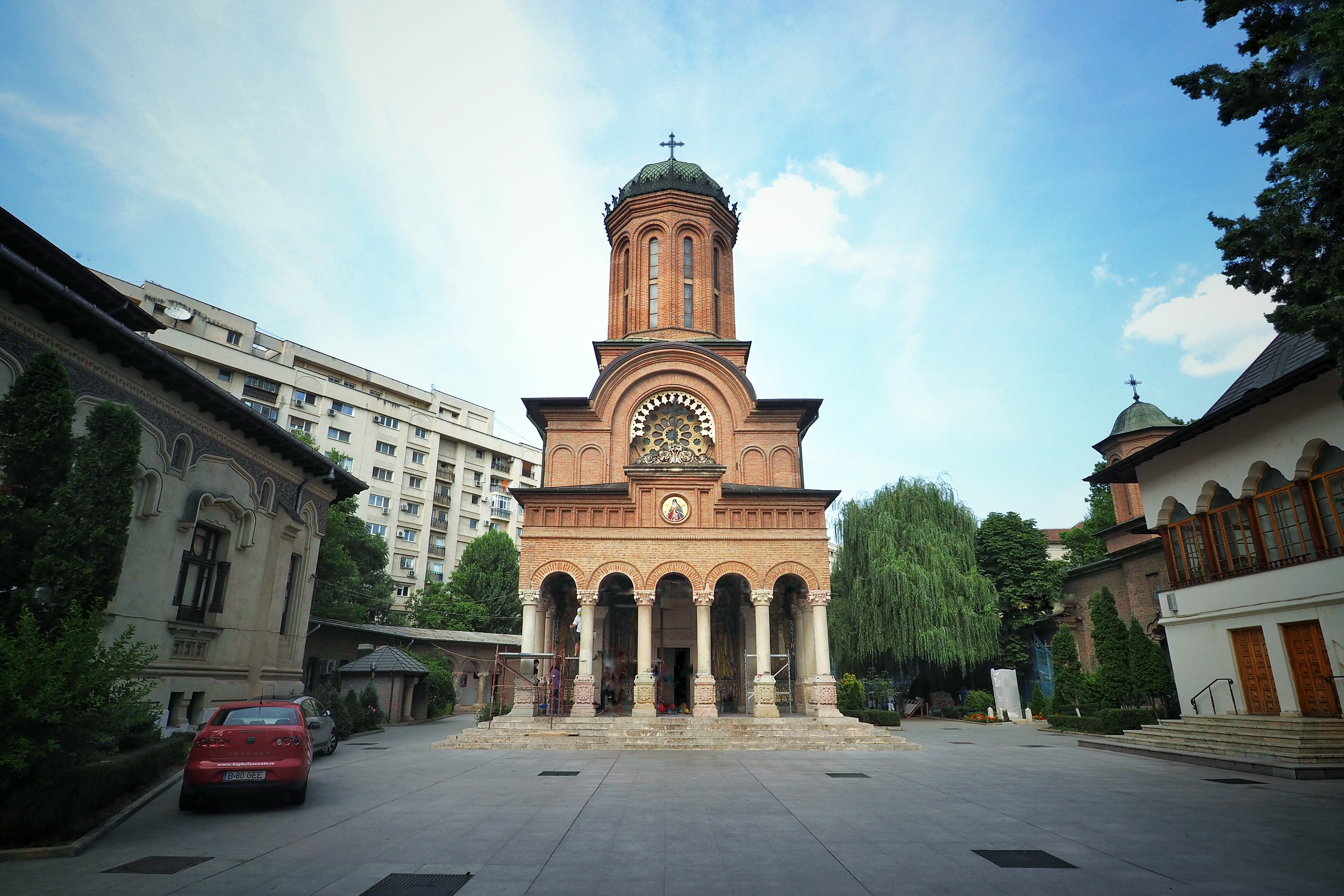
Antim Monastery Church

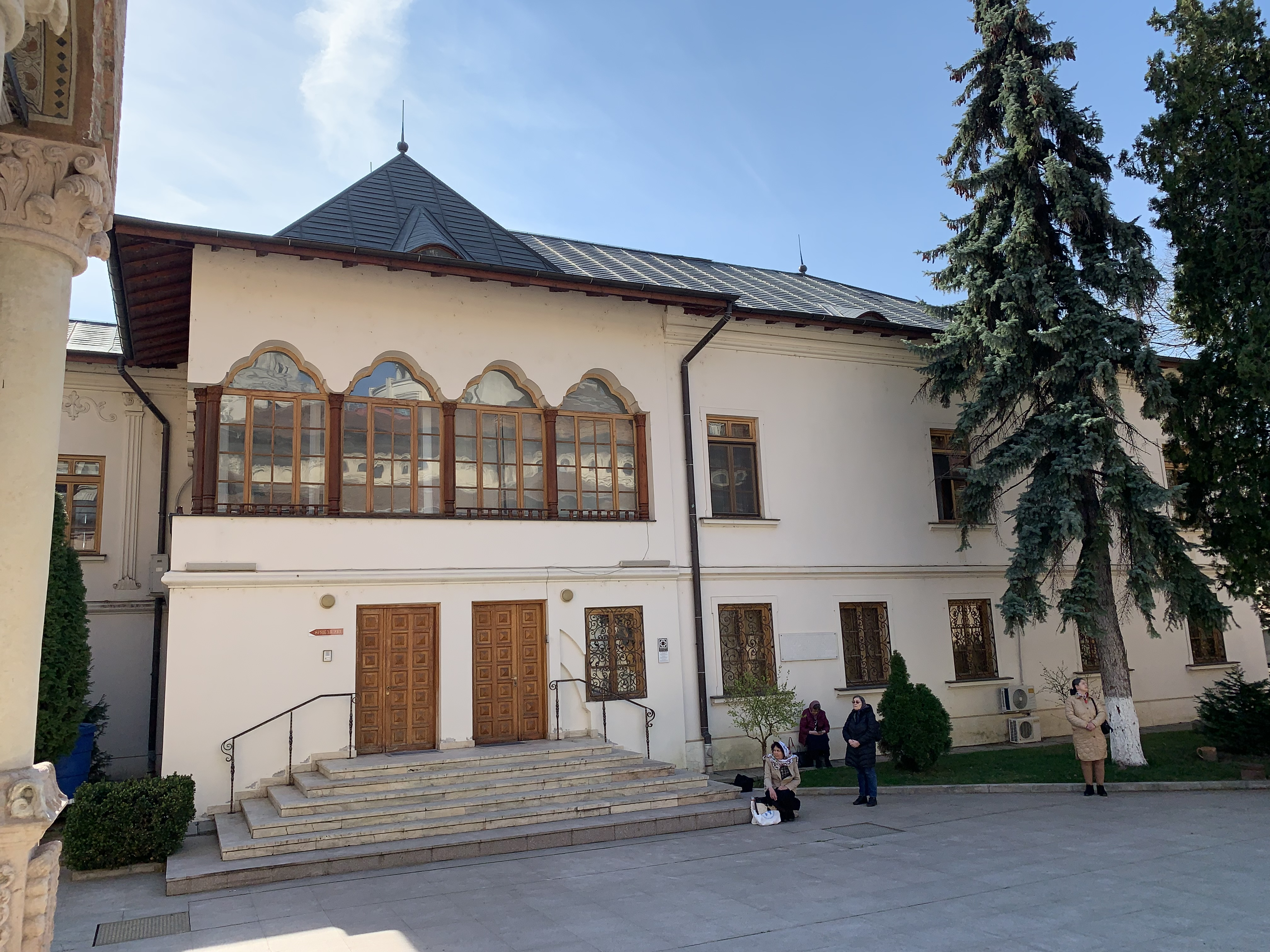
Abbot's house

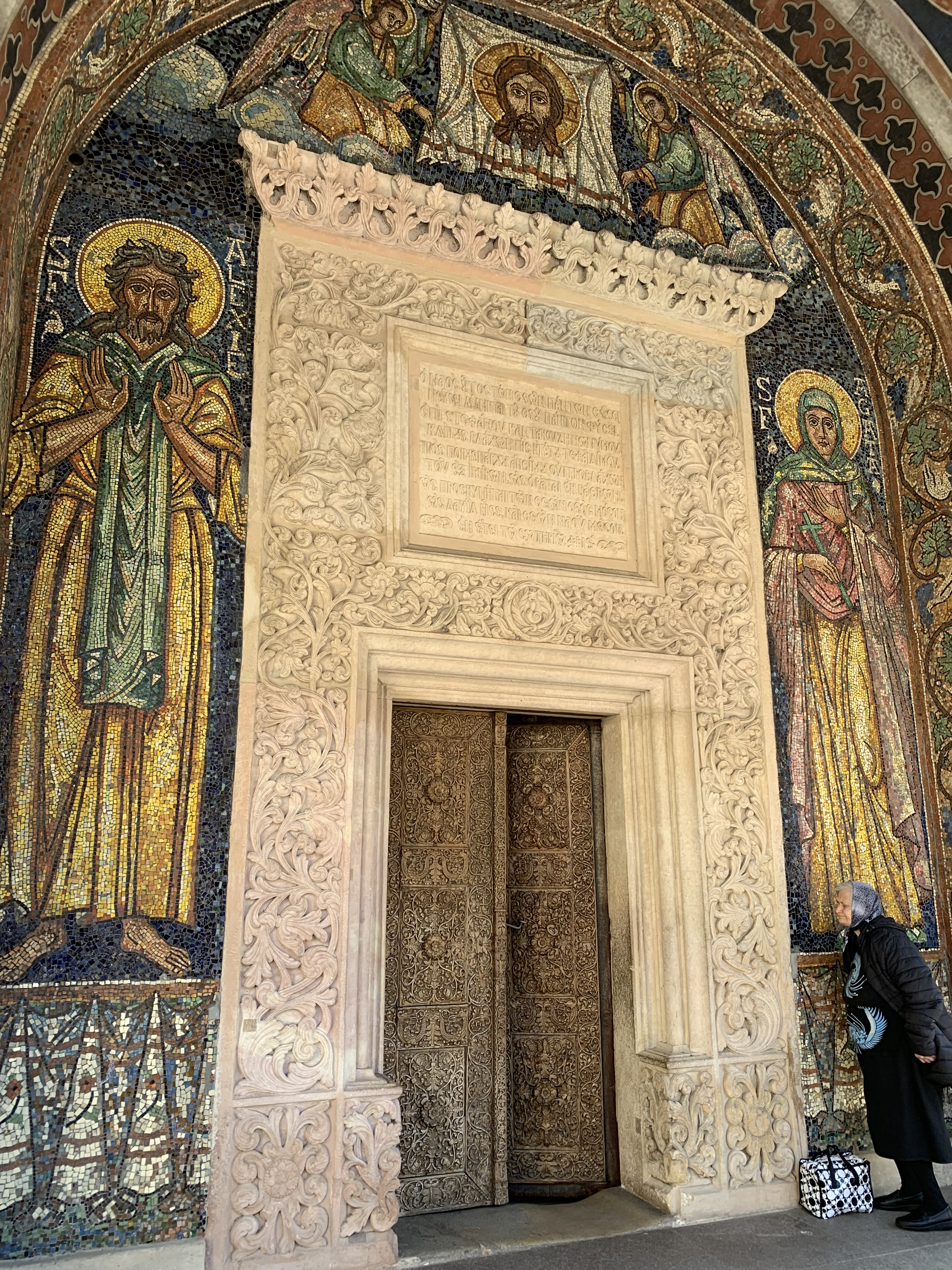
Entry door to the church building

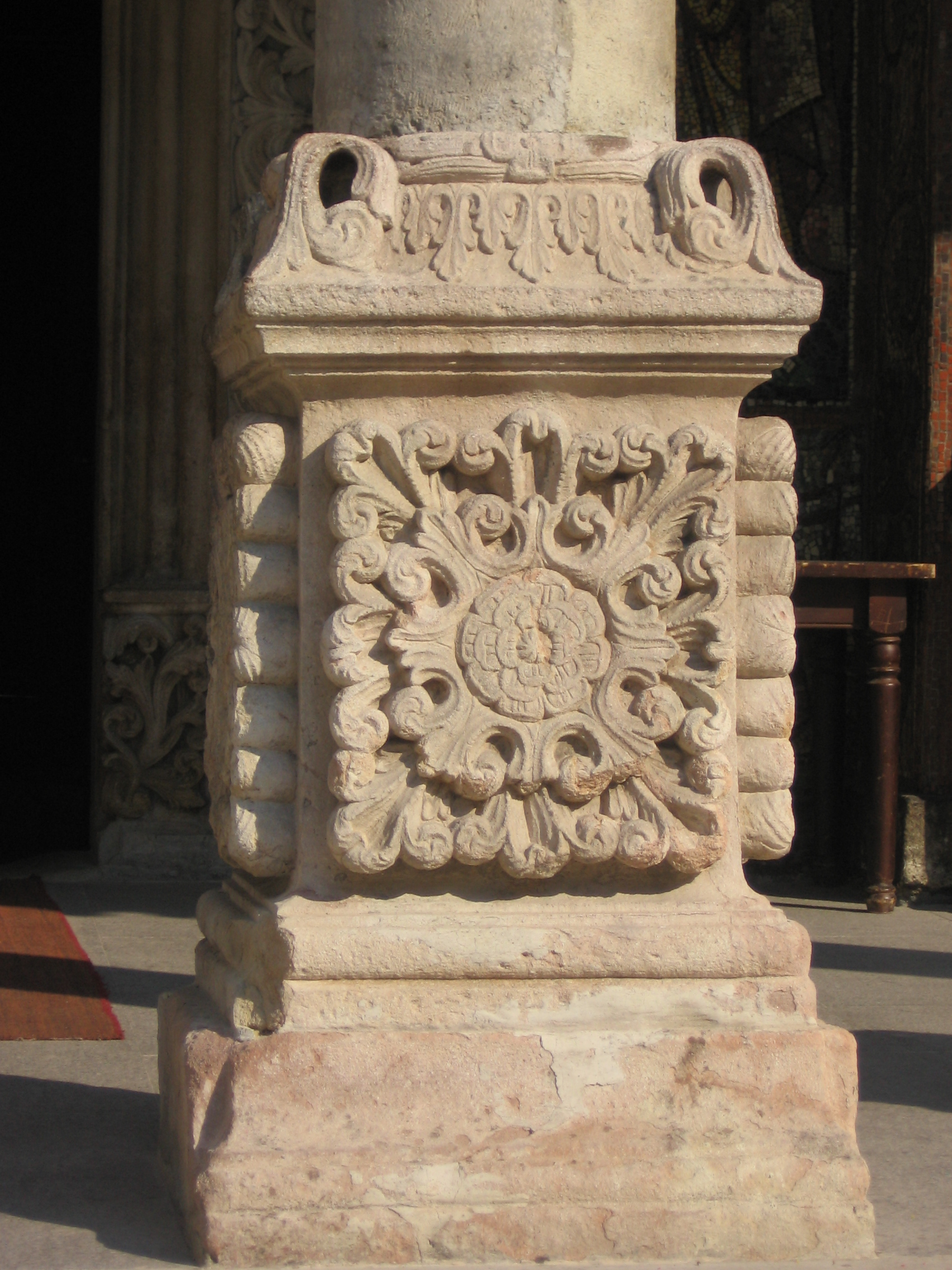
Detail of an outside column in front of the Church

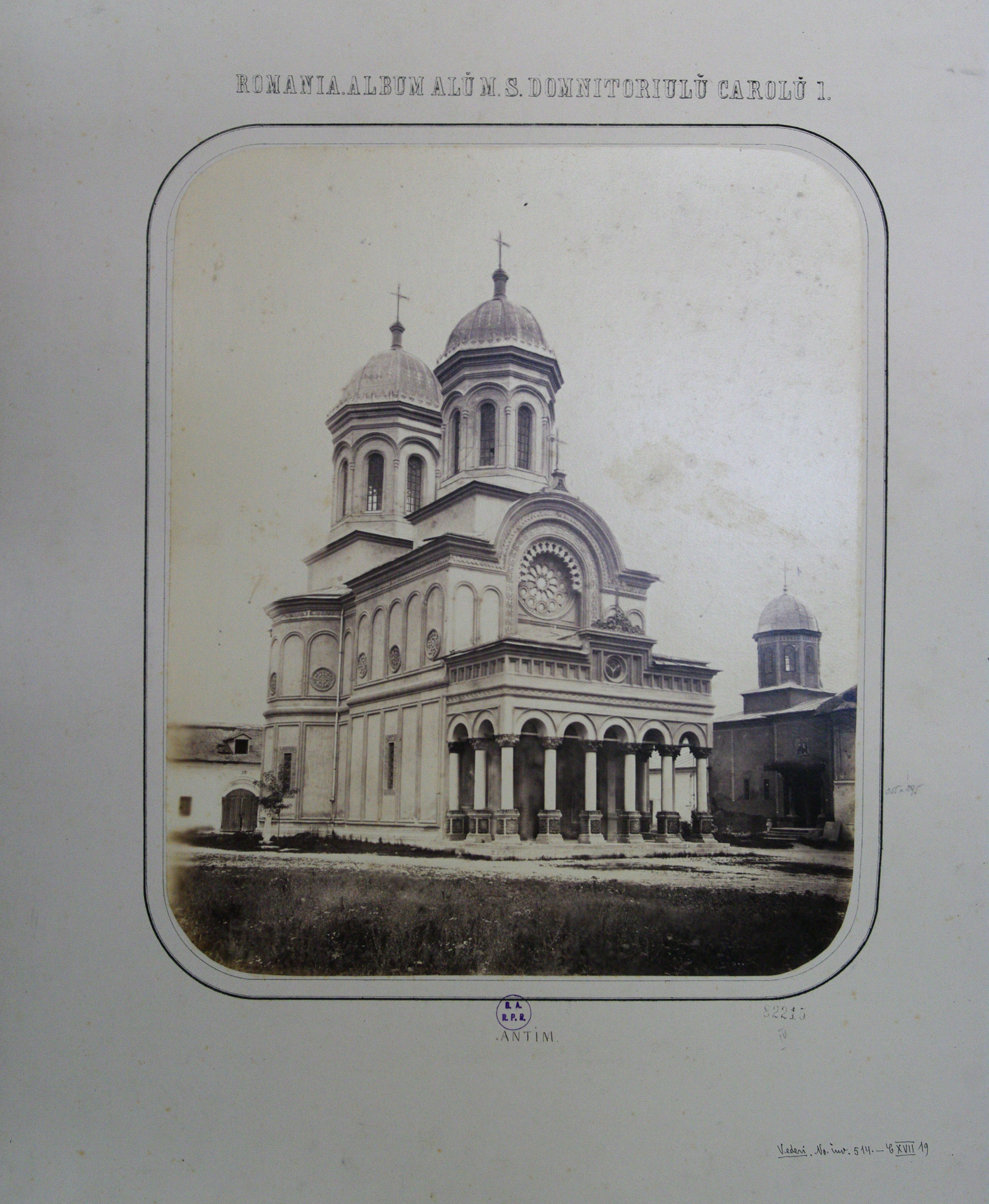
Photograph from 1867 by Carol Szathmari

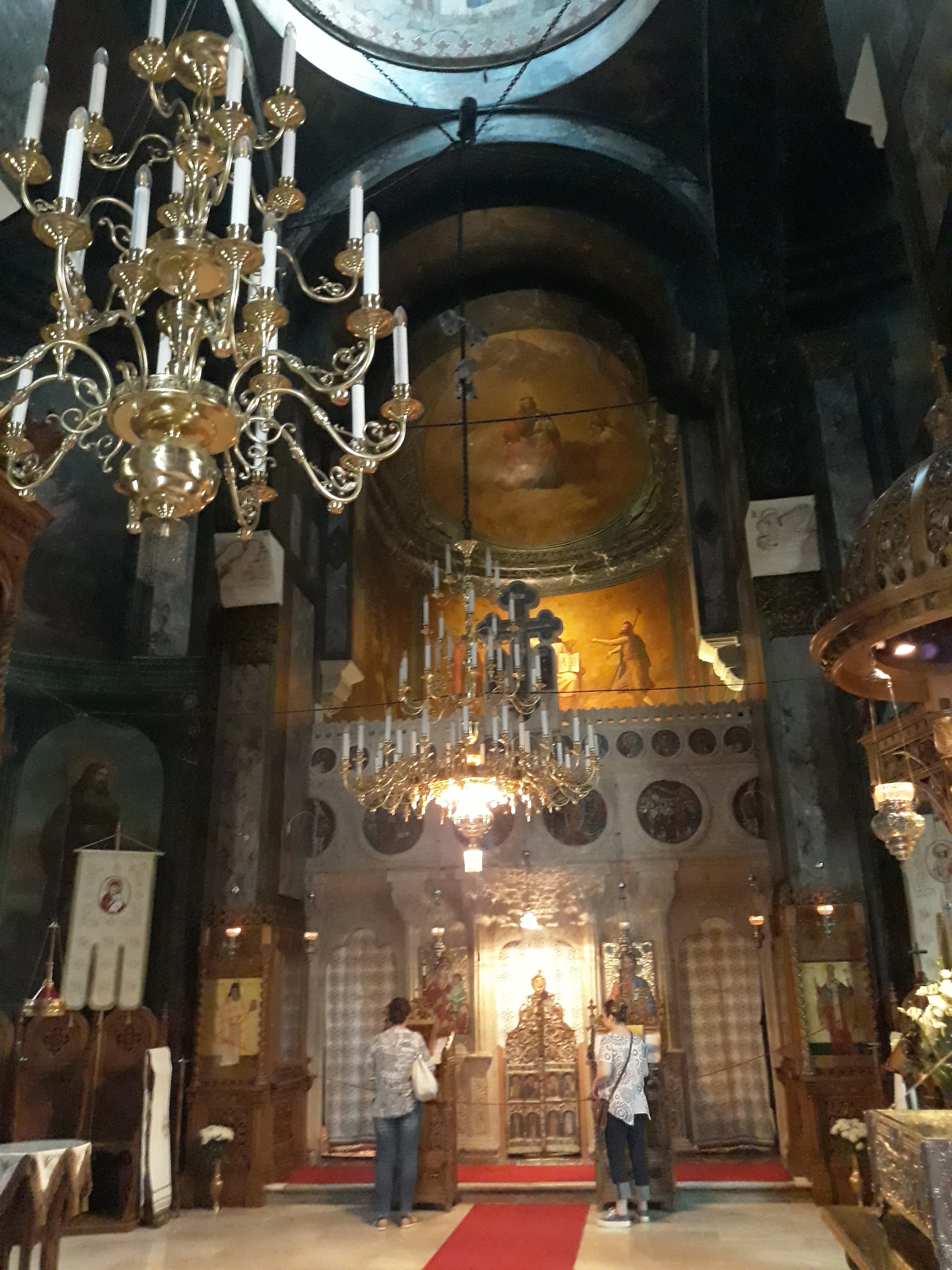
Interior of the church

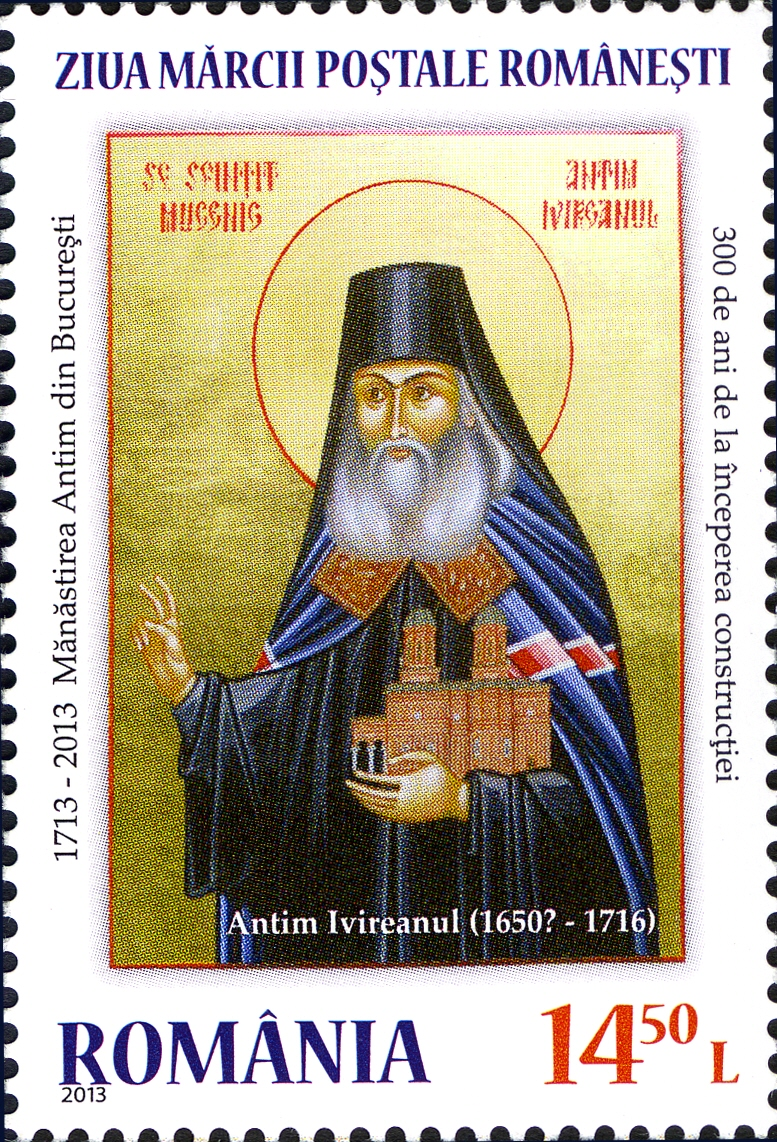
Stamp from 2013, commemorating 300 years

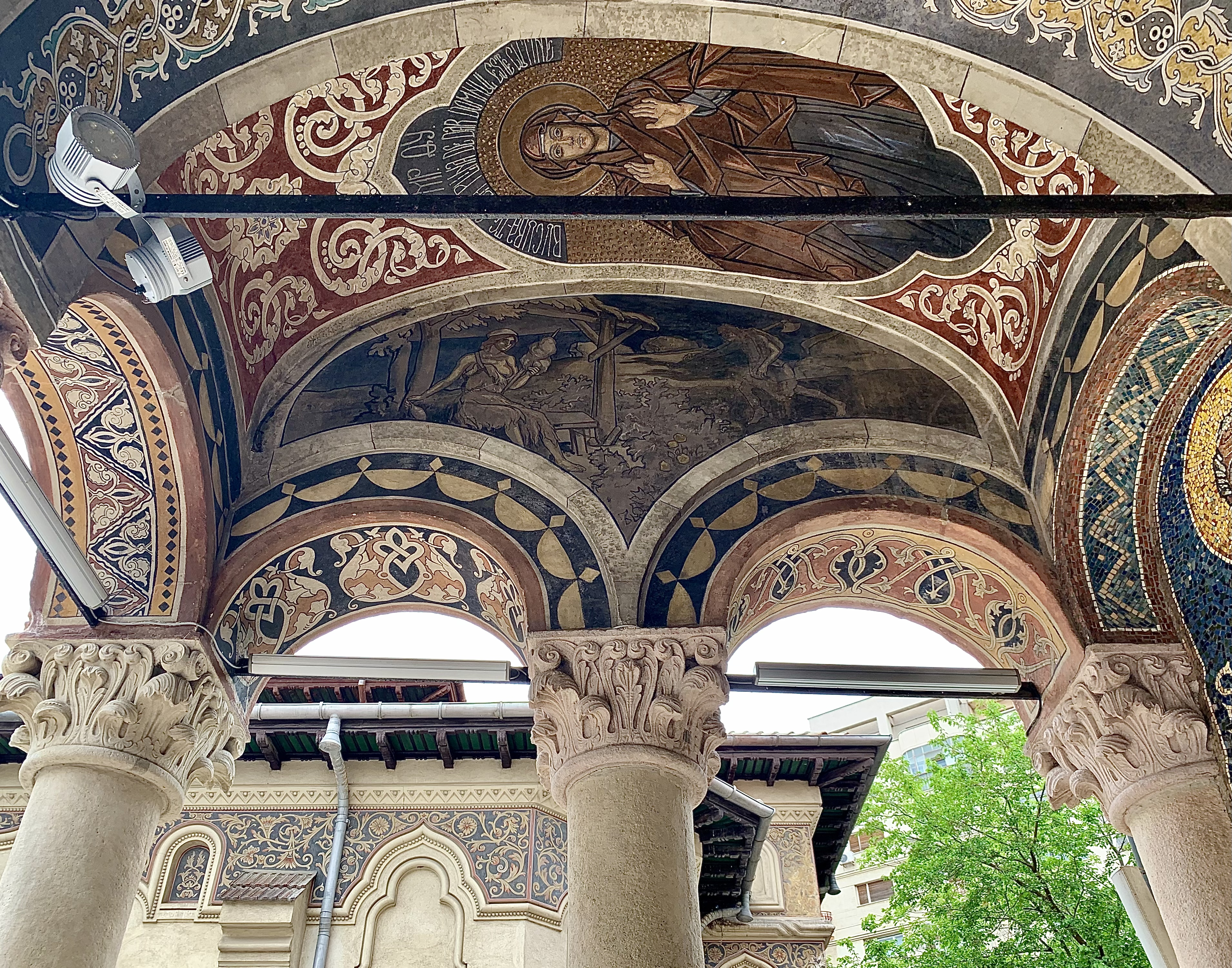
Murals on the porch entrance
