= Nicoriță Church =

Heritage site in Iași County, Romania

Coordinates: 47°09′42″N 27°36′09″E

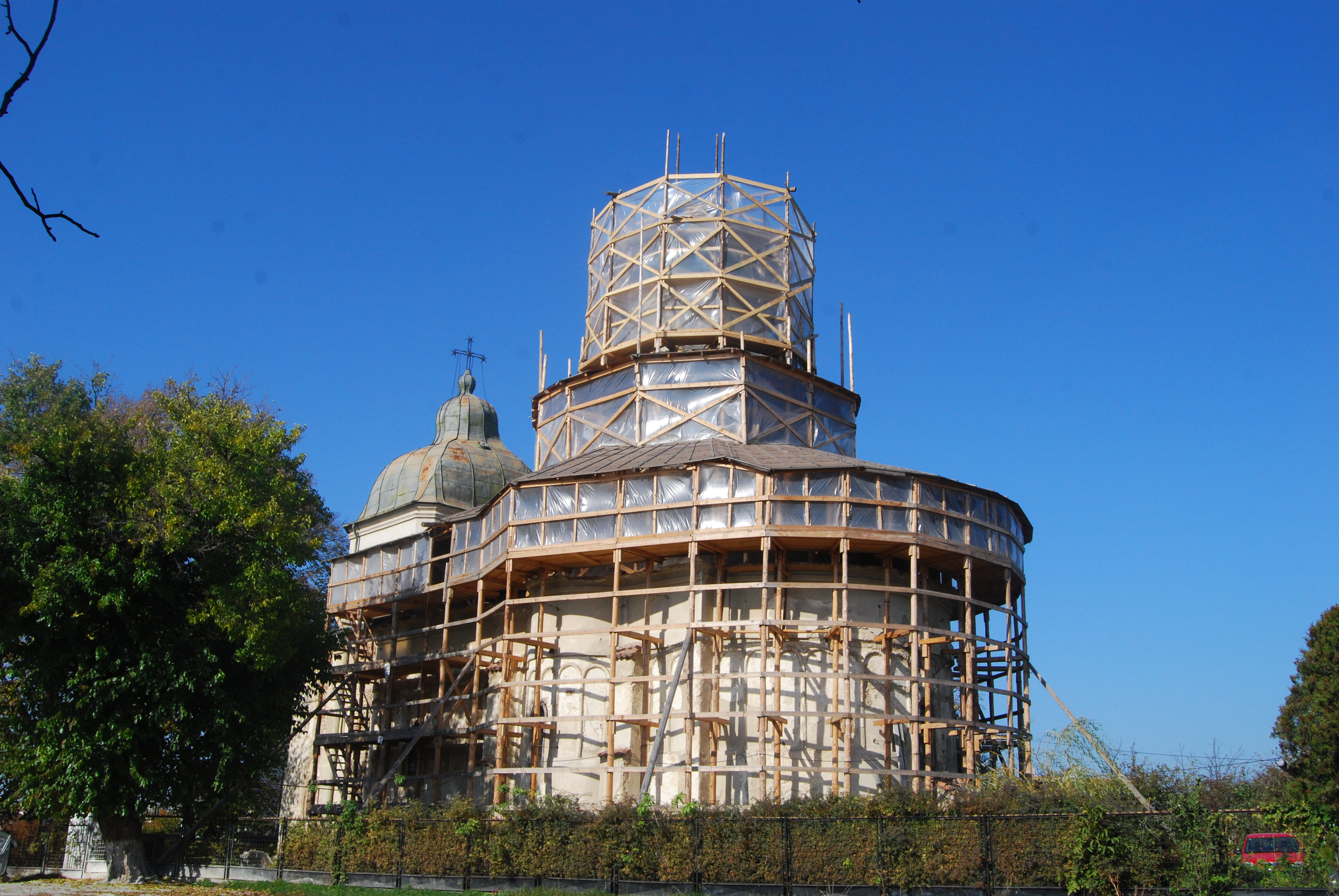
Nicoriță Church

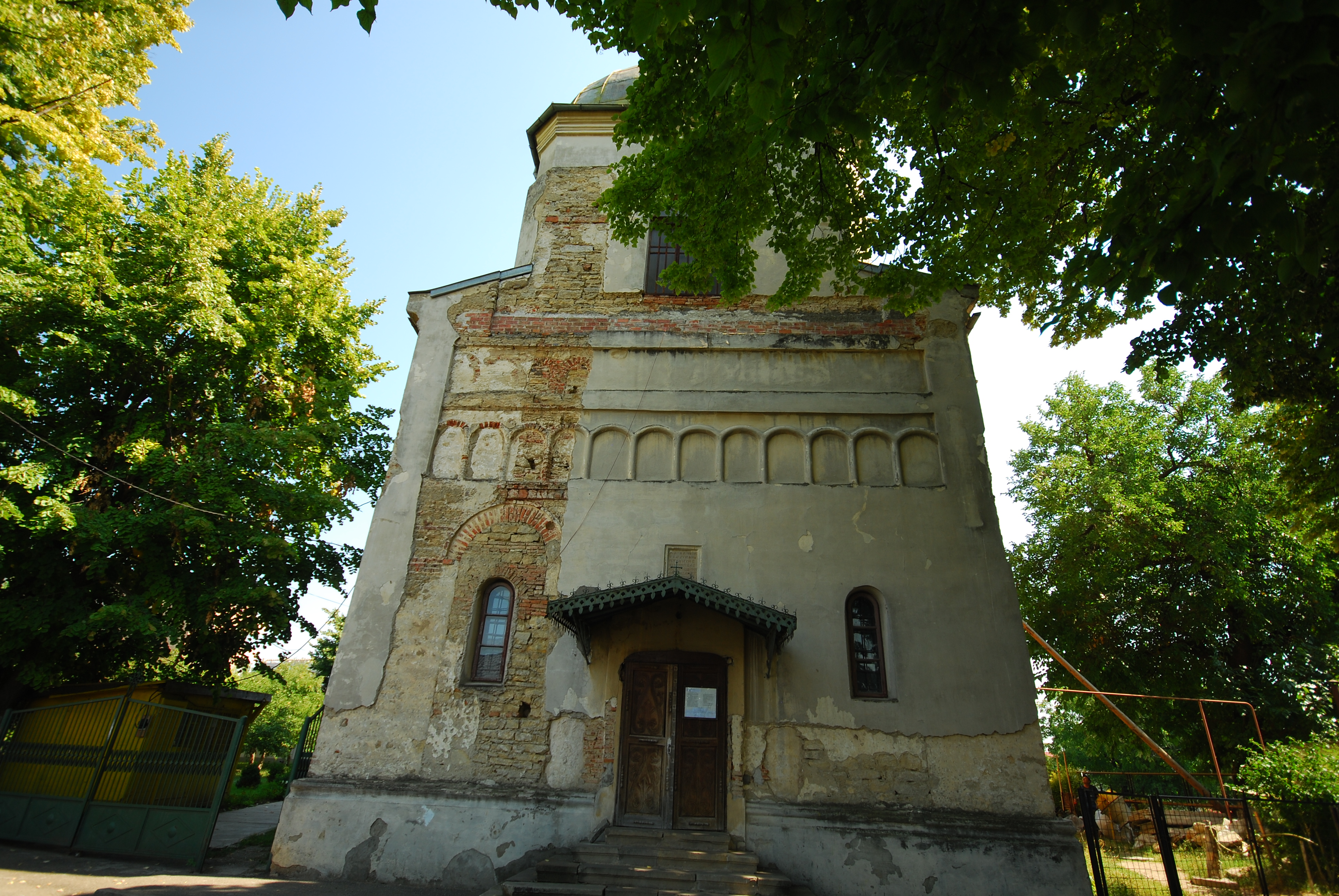
Entrance

The Nicoriță Church (Romanian: Biserica Nicoriță) is a Romanian Orthodox church located at 1 Nicoriță Street in Iași, Romania. It is dedicated to Saint John the New of Suceava.

The church is located in the eastern part of the city, on Tătărași Hill. An earlier church existed on the site; it was built of wood by the pious daughter of a boyar in memory of the fact that in 1402, during the reign of Alexander the Good, Saint John's relics stopped in the area on the way into the city. The present church was built between 1626 and 1629, on the ruins of the old one. Its ktitor was hetman Nicoară Baltag, adviser and brother-in-law to Prince Miron Barnovschi-Movilă; the co-founder was his wife Todosia. Two legends surround the building of the church. One holds that Miron asked Nicoară to supervise construction of the Barnovschi Church. Finding out that the latter was sparing with materials, intending to use leftovers in order to build his own church, the prince ordered him sealed alive into the walls of his church. Another states that the prince was envious of Nicoară's church and thus refused his permission for it to be blessed.

At the time, the eastern part of Iași was covered in thick forests, and woodcutters lived on the edges; the church was built for their benefit. It was also used by monks, to whom Prince Miron granted estates and villages throughout Moldavia. The establishment was a dependency of the Church of the Holy Sepulchre. Acquiring a certain fame, it was visited by Macarios III Zaim, the Patriarch of Antioch, during the 17th century. Following the 1863 Secularization of monastic estates in Romania, the monks left and it became a parish church. According to N. A. Bogdan, the church was used by two guilds: the makers of bows and arrows, and carpenters. The graveyard was shut down in 1876.

The structure is trefoil in shape, built of stone and brick. The spire resembles those of early Moldavian churches. In 1814, the archimandrite of the day restored the church, adding a closed foyer with a door and four windows, on top of which a bell tower was built. There are four bells, one of which was cast at Brașov in 1790. The exterior decoration is sparse, confined to niches and buttresses. The nave has an arched ceiling with an octagonal gap for the spire, while the altar space is a quarter-sphere. In 1926, part of the parish house was rebuilt and the interior painted; the church suffered damage during the 1940 Vrancea earthquake. During the subsequent repairs, the upper part of the walls was whitewashed; the painting was not of high quality, as can be discerned from what remains. By contrast, the 19th-century iconostasis is beautifully carved and features five rows of well-crafted icons. Other valuable objects in the church include two Gospel books, one decorated in silver, another in silvered velvet; the royal doors; the stand for the Virgin Mary's icon; icons of Ss. Barbara and Charalambos; old liturgical books finely typed. To the south of the church, there is a building that once served as the archimandrite's residence, dating to 1858; later a primary school, it is now a kindergarten. No old inscriptions survive, only one in Greek above the entrance recording the 1814 expansion.

The church underwent repairs in 1968, when the structure was consolidated and the interior painting remaining after the 1950 whitewashing was covered up. Further repairs took place in 1977-1978, and sporadically since 1996. It is listed as a historic monument by Romania's Ministry of Culture and Religious Affairs.
