= Anthim the Iberian =

Georgian saint

Saint Anthim the Iberian
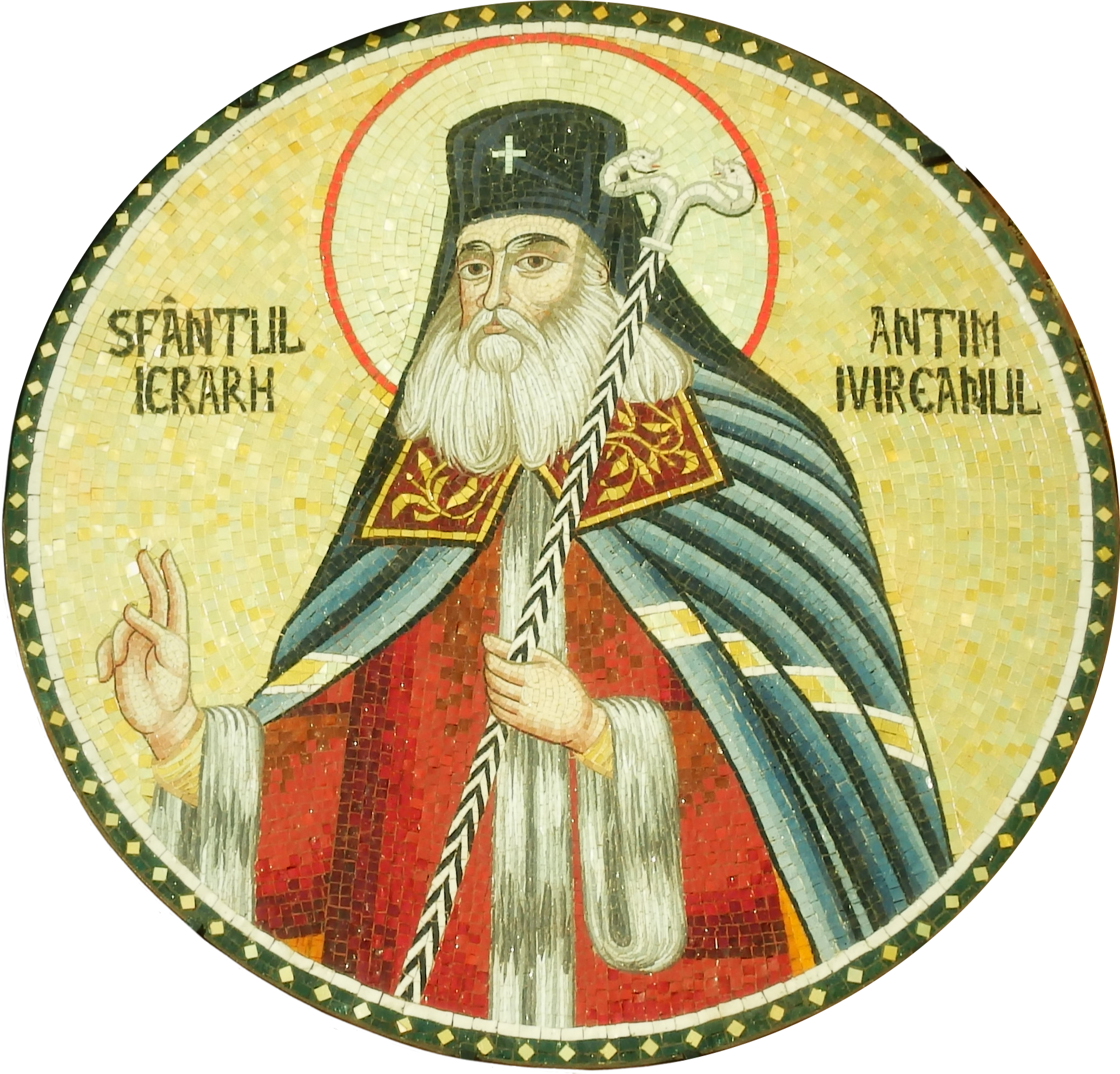
- Mosaic depicting Anthim at Antim Monastery

Metropolitan of Bucharest
- Born: c. 1650; Kingdom of Kartli (modern-day Georgia)
- Died: 1716; Adrianople, Ottoman Empire (modern-day Edirne, Turkey)
- Venerated in: Eastern Orthodox Church
- Canonized: 1992-09-27, Bucharest by the Synod of the Romanian Orthodox Church
- Feast: 13 June (Georgian); 27 September (Romanian)

Anthim the Iberian (Romanian: Antim Ivireanul, Georgian: ანთიმოზ ივერიელი – Antimoz Iverieli; secular name: Andria; 1650 — September or October 1716) was a Georgian theologian, scholar, calligrapher, philosopher and one of the greatest ecclesiastic figures of Wallachia, led the printing press of the prince of Wallachia, and was Metropolitan of Bucharest in 1708–1715.

== Early life ==
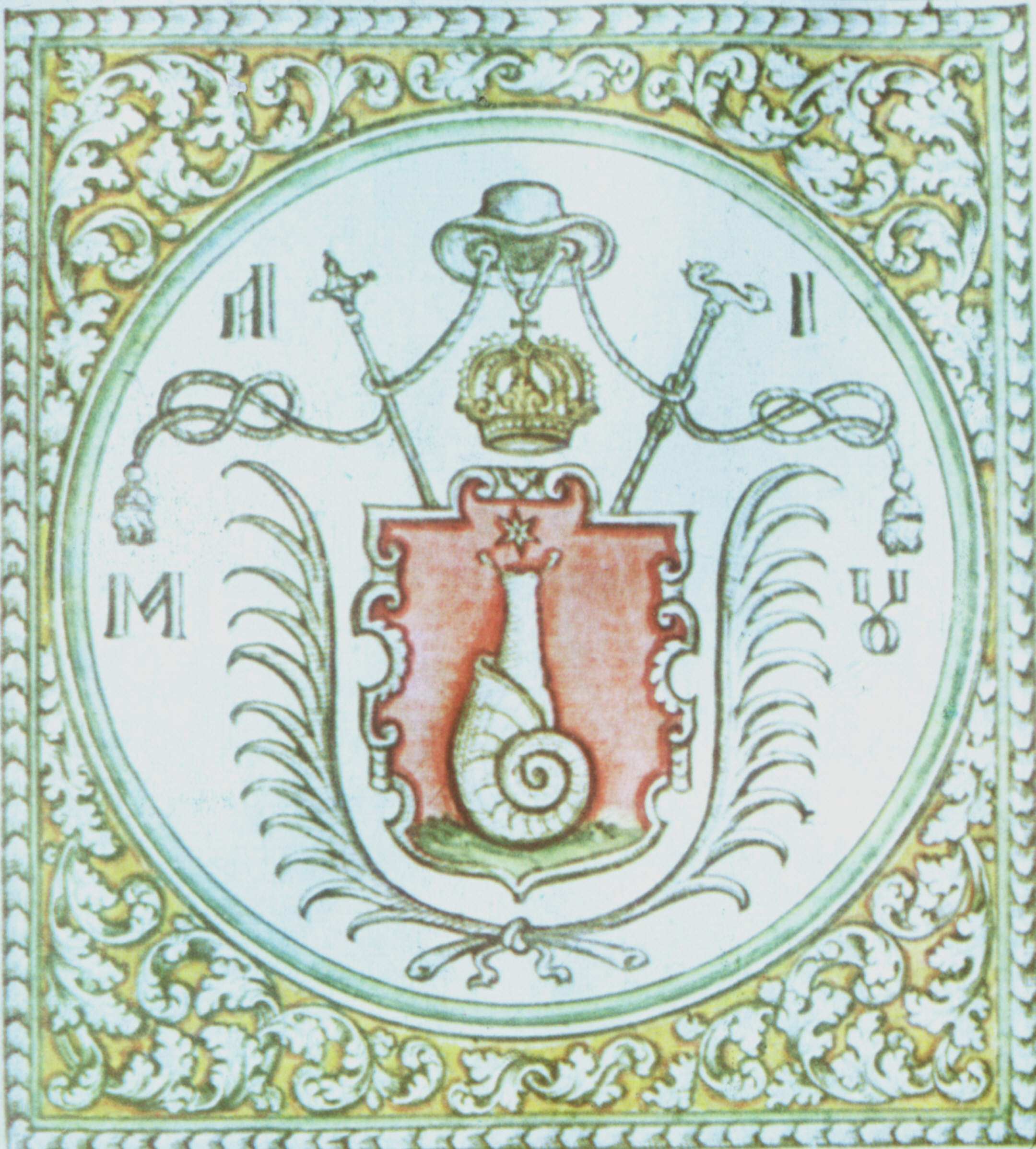
Anthim's coat of arms in an 18th-century manuscript

Anthim was born in the Kingdom of Kartli, a Georgian kingdom then known as Iberia in the west. Anthim was taken prisoner by Ottoman troops, and sold in the slave market at Constantinople. He was trained as an artisan, learning wood sculpting, painting, embroidery, and calligraphy. At some point he was ransomed by the Patriarch of Constantinople. He took orders in Istanbul, while living on the compounds of the Patriarchate. Patriarch Dositheos traveled to Iași, taking Anthim with him. A Greek printing office had been established there in 1682.

== In Wallachia ==
In 1689 he was asked to settle in Wallachia by Prince Constantin Brâncoveanu, and in 1691 was given charge of the newly founded printing press in Bucharest. In 1693, he published the Gospels in Romanian. In 1695, being appointed father superior (egumen) of the Snagov Monastery, and established a printing office at the new location.

In addition to Georgian, Anthim spoke and wrote Greek, Turkish, and Arabic. He soon acquired a thorough knowledge of Romanian, and was instrumental in helping to introduce that language into the local church as its official language. In 1702 he returned to Bucharest.

He became bishop of Râmnic in 1705, and in 1708 Metropolitan of Wallachia.

In 1709, Anthim founded the first Georgian printing press in Tbilisi. Through his pupil Mihai Iștvanovici, he also trained Georgians in the art of printing and personally cut the type with which the first printed Georgian Gospels were made in 1710. He also printed a short catechism to assist his priests in giving catechetical instruction. In addition, Anthim published 25 other books in Romanian, as well as Church Slavonic, Greek, and Arabic (usually in bilingual volumes, such as the Greek-Arabic Missal of 1702); this meant that he was also the first in Wallachia to use Arabic fonts.

His homiletic work, the Didache, was a collection of sermons meant as a sharp critique of contemporary habits and morals; notably, beside Christian sources, Anthim made reference to classical philosophy. Alongside his literary output, the cleric was the builder of the All-Saints Monastery in Bucharest, now known as the Antim Monastery in his memory.

== Death ==
Anthim's overt opposition to Ottoman tutelage over Wallachia made him an adversary of the Phanariote regime. The new Prince Nicholas Mavrocordatos imprisoned him, and subsequently exiled him to Mount Sinai. Anthim was captured by the Ottomans while making the trip, and assassinated somewhere in modern-day Bulgaria (his body would have been discarded in the Maritsa or the Tundzha). It is alleged that his murder was ordered by Mavrocordatos himself.

== Canonisation ==
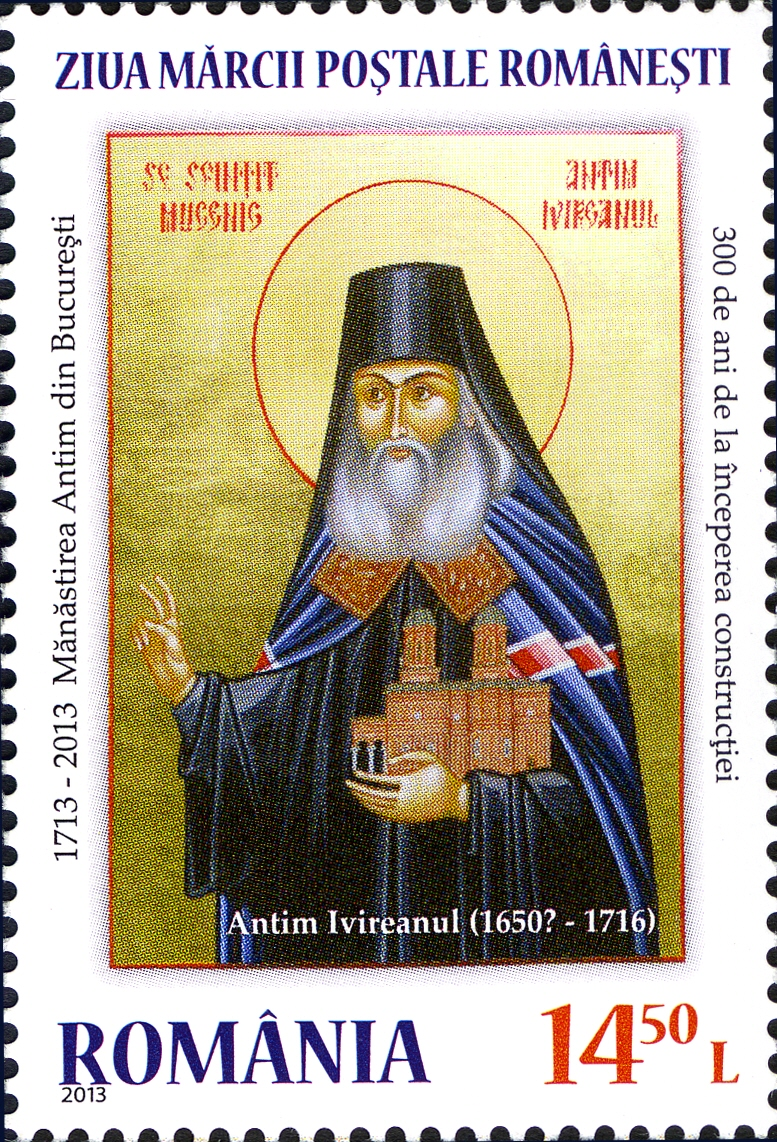
Anthim the Iberian on a 2013 stamp of Romania.

In 1992 Anthim was canonised by the Romanian Orthodox Church having his saint day on September 27. In memory of 300 years of his death, Romanian Orthodox Church declared 2016 as Saint Anthim the Iverian year.

== Legacy ==
In the modern day, Anthim represents a symbol of the relations between Georgia and Romania.

A rugby union trophy, the Antim Cup, contested between Romania and Georgia every year, is named after him.

== Sources ==
- "Antimoz Iverieli". Encyclopedia Sakartvelo. Vol. 1. Tbilisi. 1997. p. 158.
- Gvinchidze, Otar (1973). Antimoz Iverieli. Tbilisi.
- George Călinescu (1968). Istoria literaturii române. Bucharest. p. 19.
