= Carte Românească de Învățătură =

Carte Românească de Învățătură (Romanian Book of Learning) is the original title of two 17th-century Romanian books, both commissioned by Prince Vasile Lupu of Moldavia and printed in Iași.

- Cazania lui Varlaam (The Homiliary of Varlaam), a collection of homilies compiled by Metropolitan Varlaam of Moldavia, published in 1643
- Pravila lui Vasile Lupu (The Code of Vasile Lupu), a code of law, printed in 1646
