= Metropolitan Damian =

Metropolitan Damian of Moldavia (? - 1447) was a former Orthodox and later Greek Catholic Metropolitan from 1437 to 1447 of the Metropolis of Moldavia and Bukovina. In 1439 Damian participated with his vicar Constantine of Council of Florence, whose decision has signed, becoming the first bishop of the Romanian countries that united with the Latin Church. Returning to Suceava, he remained until his death in communion with the Apostolic See of Rome. His successor in the Metropolitan, Joachim, was also united, but was expelled from Moldova by opponents of reconciliation with the Roman Church, headed by Metropolitan Theoctistus, which enjoyed the support of the political authorities.

== See also ==
Metropolis of Moldavia and Bukovina
