= Barnovschi Church =

Heritage site in Iași County, Romania

Coordinates: 47.1603°N 27.5933°E

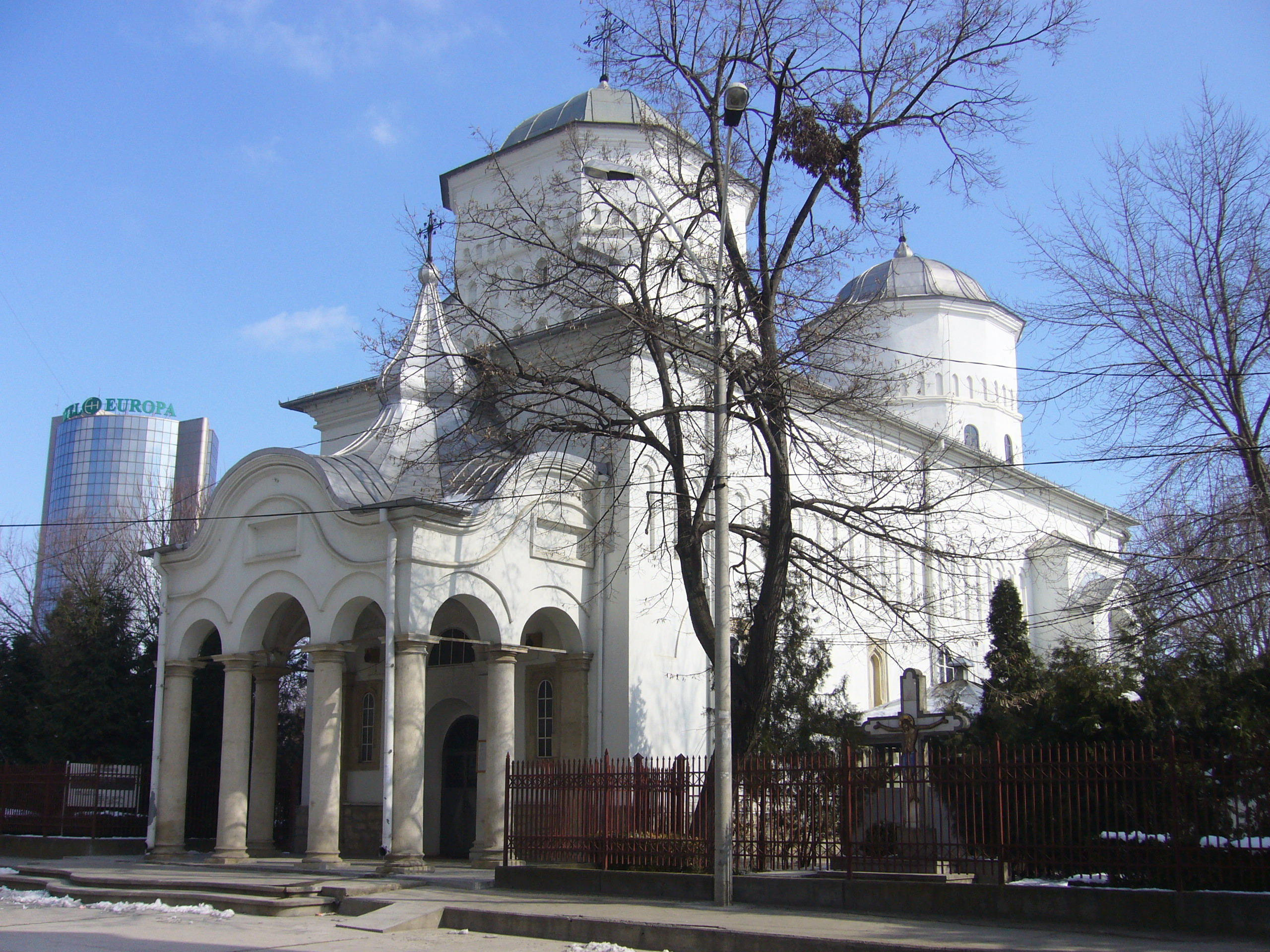
Barnovschi Church

The Barnovschi Church (Romanian: Biserica Barnovschi) is a Romanian Orthodox church located at 26 Ghica Vodă Street in Iași, Romania. It is dedicated to the Dormition of the Mother of God and to Saints Joachim and Anna.

== History ==
Building of the church began in 1627, in the second year of Prince Miron Barnovschi-Movilă's reign. In the foundation act, he listed himself and his mother, the nun Elisafta, as ktitors. As he left the country in 1629, to return only briefly, completion of the work fell to his executors, Iancu Costin and Matei Gavrilaș. At some point prior to June 1633, Barnovschi asked them to sell his properties in Poland and use the money to finish the church, which he had already placed under control of the Church of the Holy Sepulchre. Prior to departing for Constantinople, where he was beheaded, he also asked that he be buried in Moldavia. Vasile Lupu carried out this wish, but no record was kept of where the burial took place. Paul of Aleppo claimed that Miron was interred in his own church. During archaeological digs in 1998, an arched brick crypt was identified under the floor in the middle of the nave. It is believed that the bones belong to Barnovschi.

When the original roof burned, it was rebuilt by Lupu. It is believed that the church was covered in tiles, but following an 1836 fire that affected large parts of the city, a new roof of tin plates was installed. The church functioned as a monastery for a time, and was the official guesthouse for Orthodox patriarchs visiting Moldavia. Its cells hosted a school taught in Greek. In 1983, during systematization, the annexed buildings were demolished, and apartment blocks were built on the land, up to the church door. Aside from the church, only the bell tower and an adjacent basement remained. Renovation work on the interior and exterior began in 1994.

Barnovschi donated an epitaphios to the church, presumably stitched by his mother. In the middle, the Burial of Jesus is depicted, and there is an inscription in Greek. The prince also asked Metropolitan Varlaam Moțoc to order several icons from Moscow. Although these were painted and paid, they never arrived in Iași, in spite of numerous requests, including to Tsar Michael I. In 1653, Paul of Aleppo saw a painting of Barnovschi astride a while horse. At the time, it was said that at the moment of the latter's execution, a deep crack appeared on the portrait. Paul also reported that the church was made entirely of limestone and had a closed foyer with a dome above; during the 18th century, an open foyer was added in front of this. While researching the church prior to 1885, Melchisedec Ștefănescu saw no inscription, instead finding only a portrait of Miron and his mother in the foyer, holding an image of the church; and a portrait of the prince in the nave. These are the last remnants of the original painting.

== Description ==
Above and below the windows, the facade is decorated with a row of lengthy recesses. Entry is through the open foyer, which is supported by six stone columns. The interior painting dates to 1880, but over half the walls have only plaster and whitewash on them. The linden iconostasis, from 1788, is 7 meters long. It includes 40 icons painted in red, green, black and brown, dating to the 18th century. The 1971 icons on the royal doors feature, respectively, the Madonna and Child, and the crowned Christ holding an open Gospel. The oldest icon in the iconostasis, painted on wood in 1734 by an unknown artist, depicts the Dormition; in 1806, it was encased in silvered metal. The 1791 icon of John the Baptist was done by a deacon from Mouth Athos. The style is similar, but the classical elements more pronounced. The deacon's doors show the Archangels Michael and Gabriel.

Above this row and separated by a cornice there are eight more icons, rather than the usual twelve. There is a rectangular arched space above the royal doors featuring, above, Christ on the Throne of God; and below, a western-inspired Last Supper. Elsewhere, an icon of the Virgin Mary has a cross above, the old one having disappeared. An icon of Saint Anne holding the Virgin Mary, reportedly wonderworking and dated to 1625, is painted on wood and set up in a special iconostasis.

The bell tower is located 50 meters south of the church. Built in large blocks of stone and brick, it has a roof of zinc. The tower is on two arched levels. It has a staircase and a hiding place, both carved into the walls. The large bell was donated by Barnovschi in 1628. Cast at Lviv and weighing 400 kg, it is inscribed in Old Church Slavonic and with a Latin translation of a Psalm of David. Being cracked, it is not presently in use. The small bell, of 70 kg, is carved in the Romanian Cyrillic alphabet and features a date of 1715. A third bell weighs 300 kg.

The church is listed as a historic monument by Romania's Ministry of Culture and Religious Affairs, with a date of 1628. Also listed are the 1786 basements and the 17th-century cell ruins and bell tower.

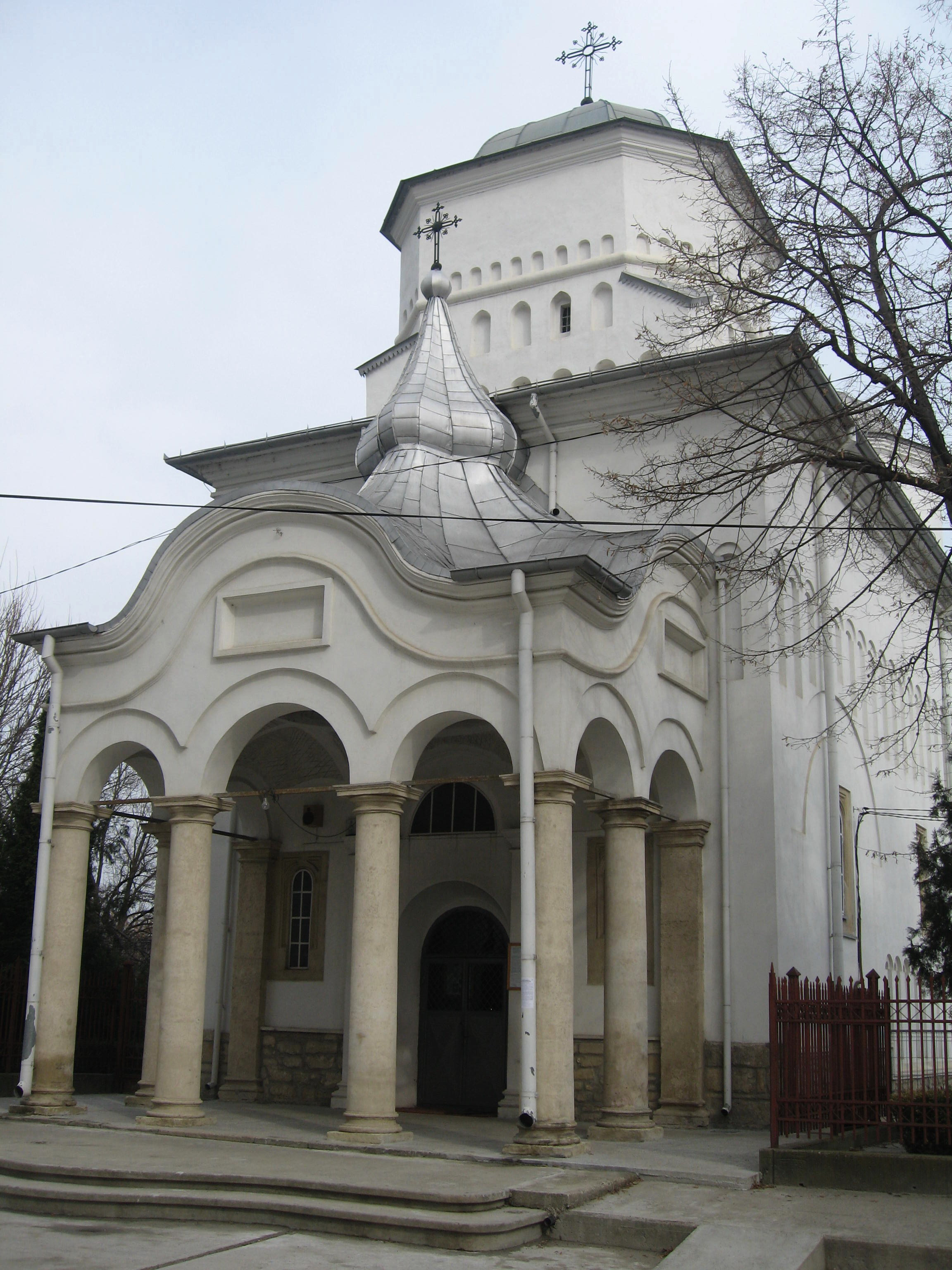
Entrance

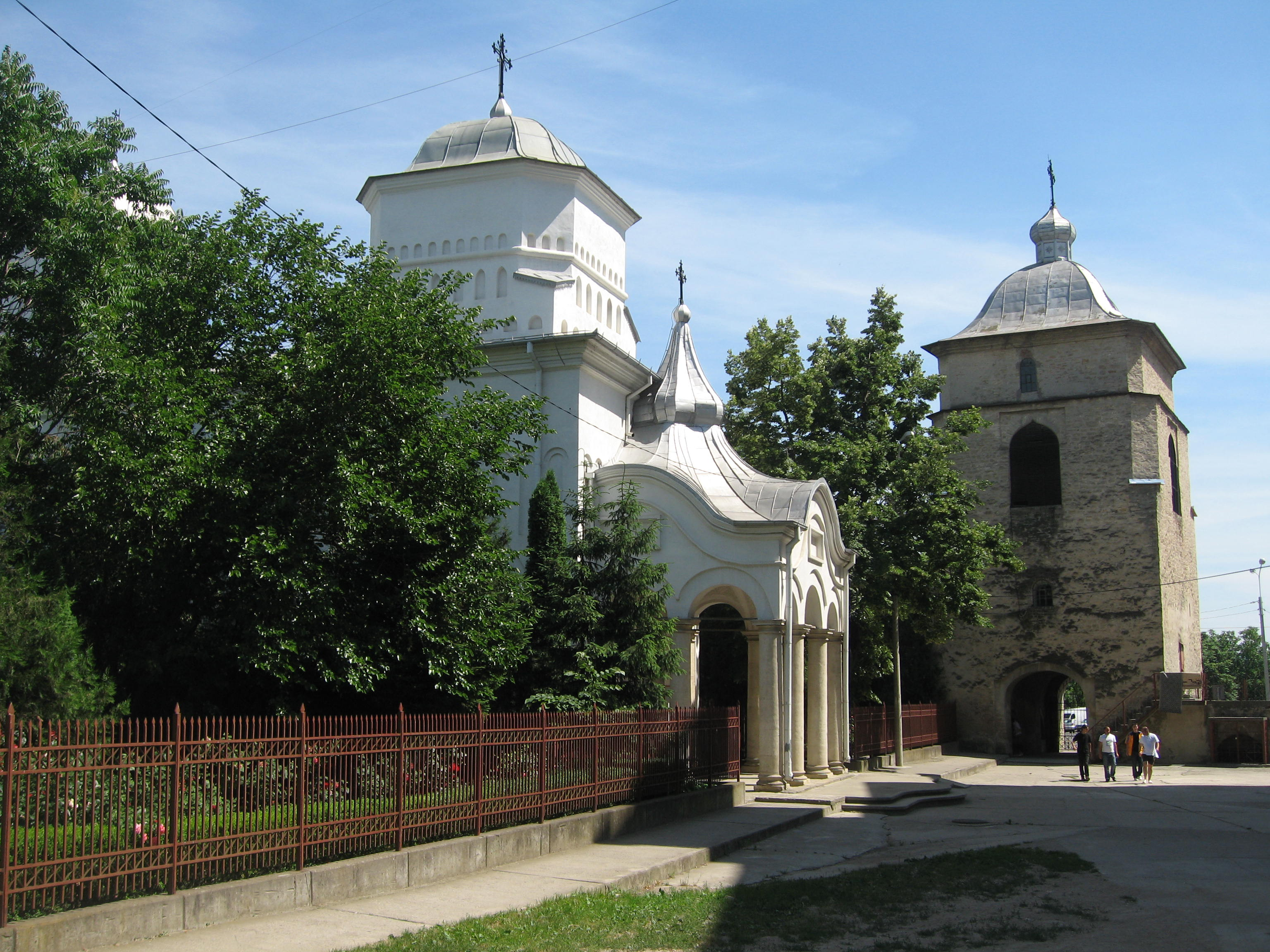
Church and bell tower

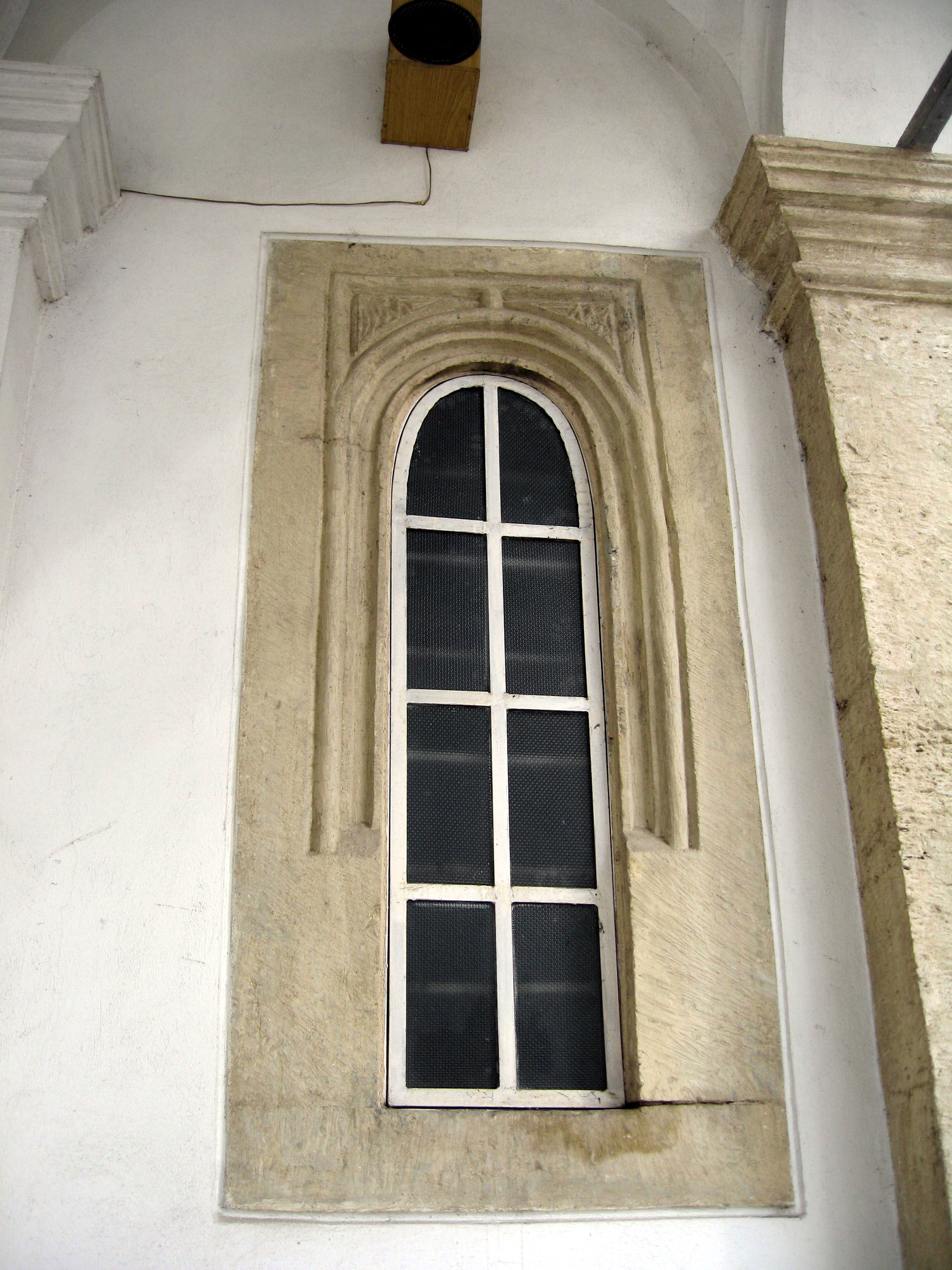
Window

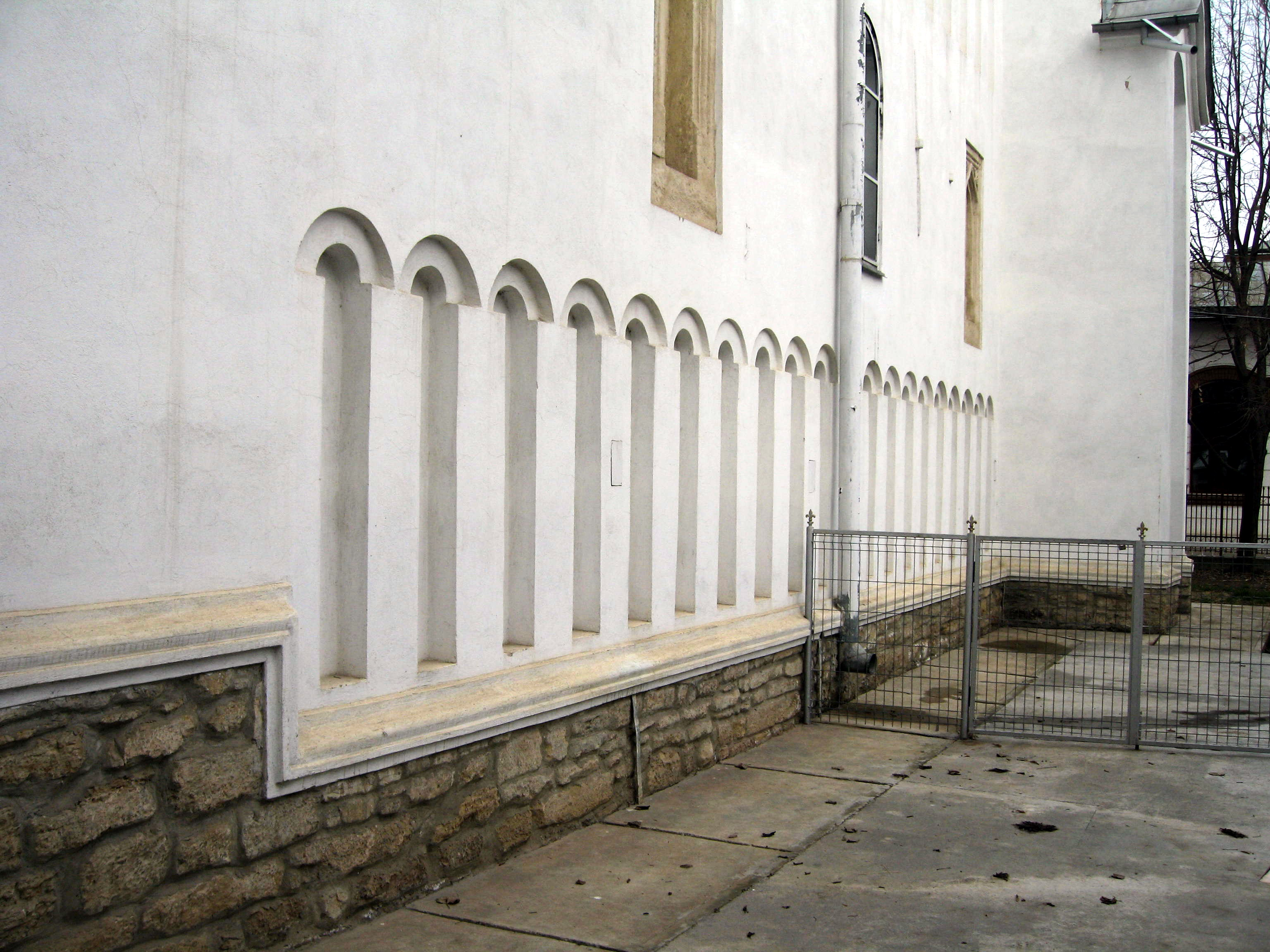
Side wall

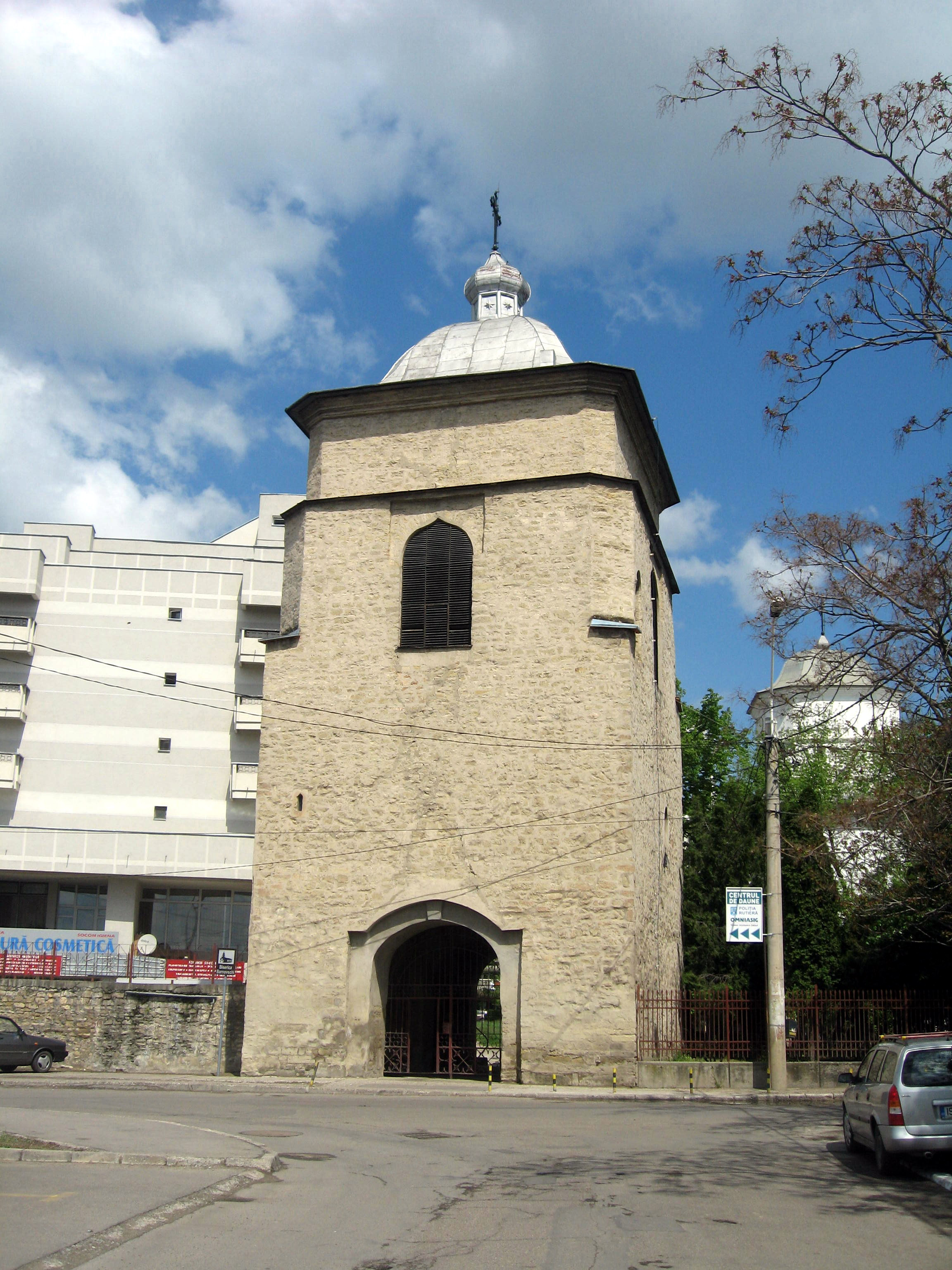
Bell tower

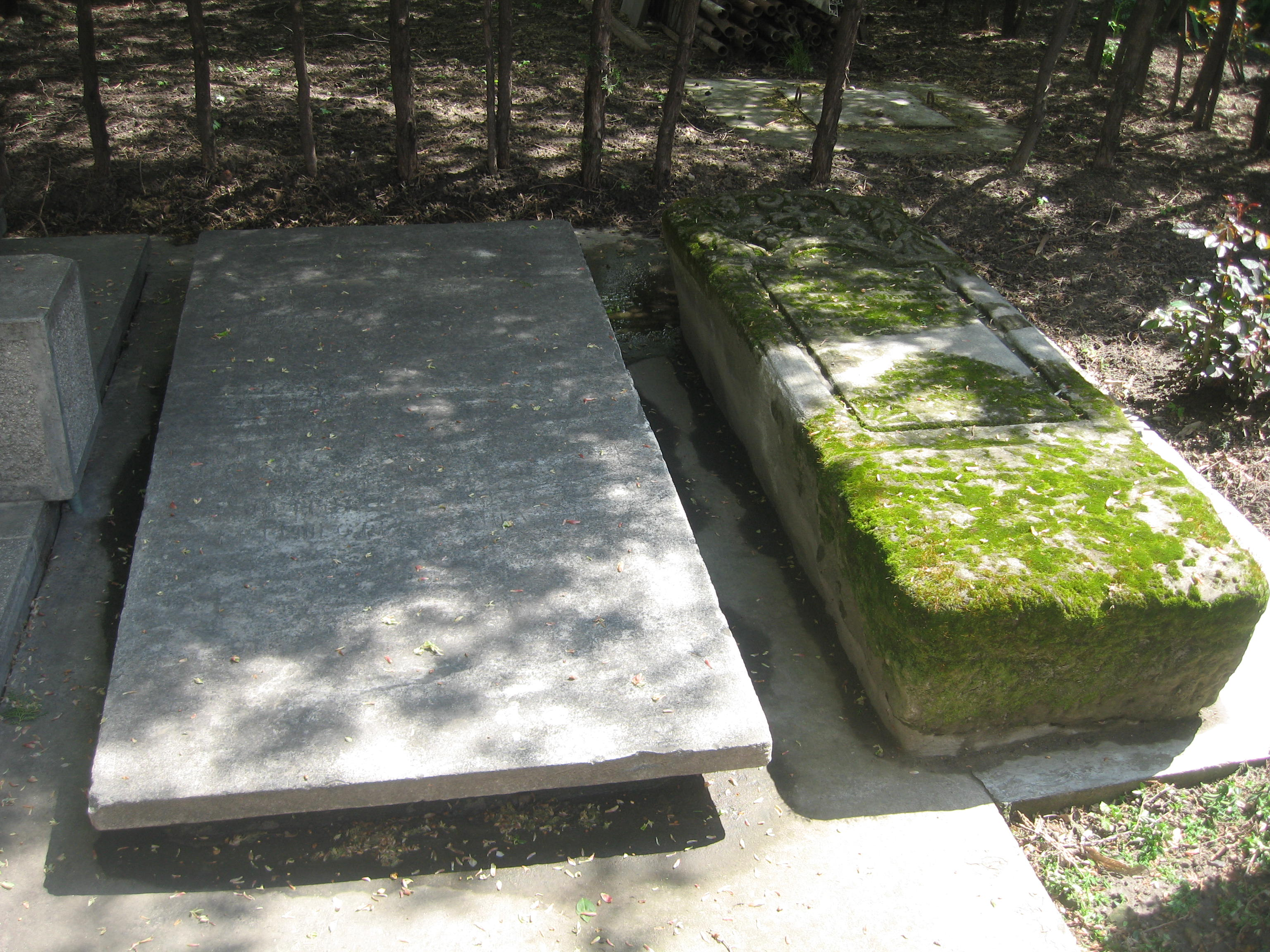
Graves

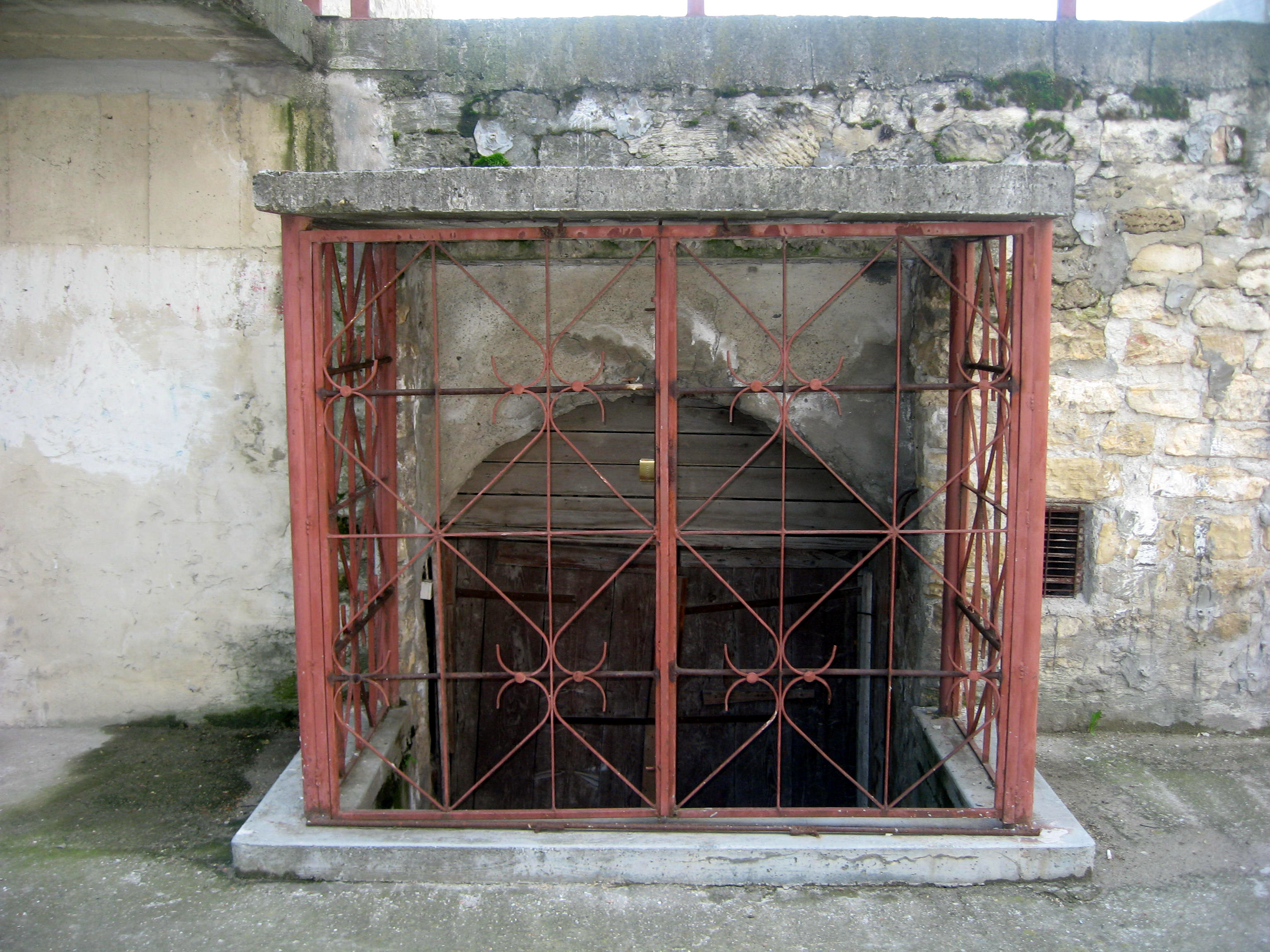
Basements

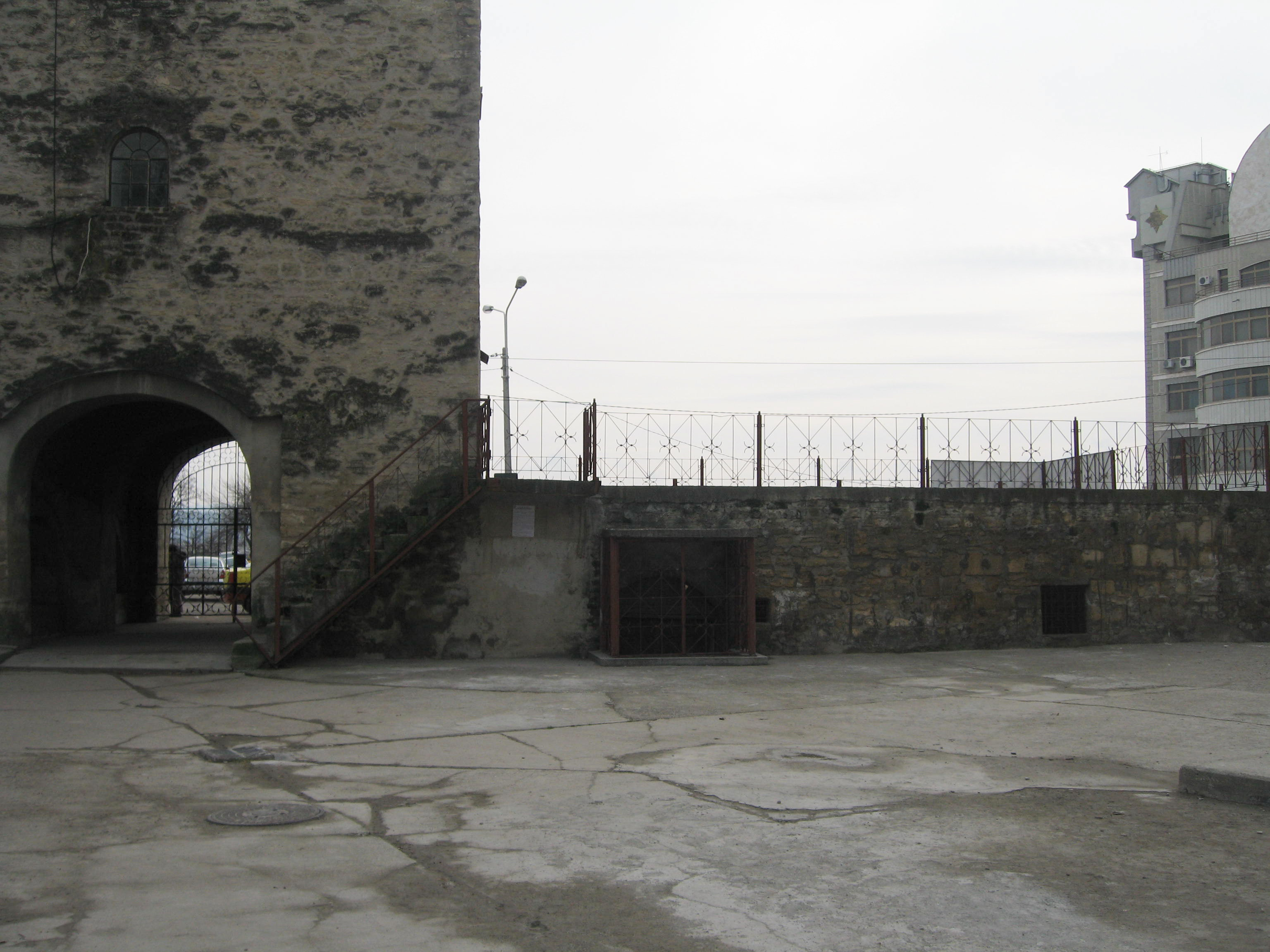
Cell ruins
