= Georgia–Romania relations =

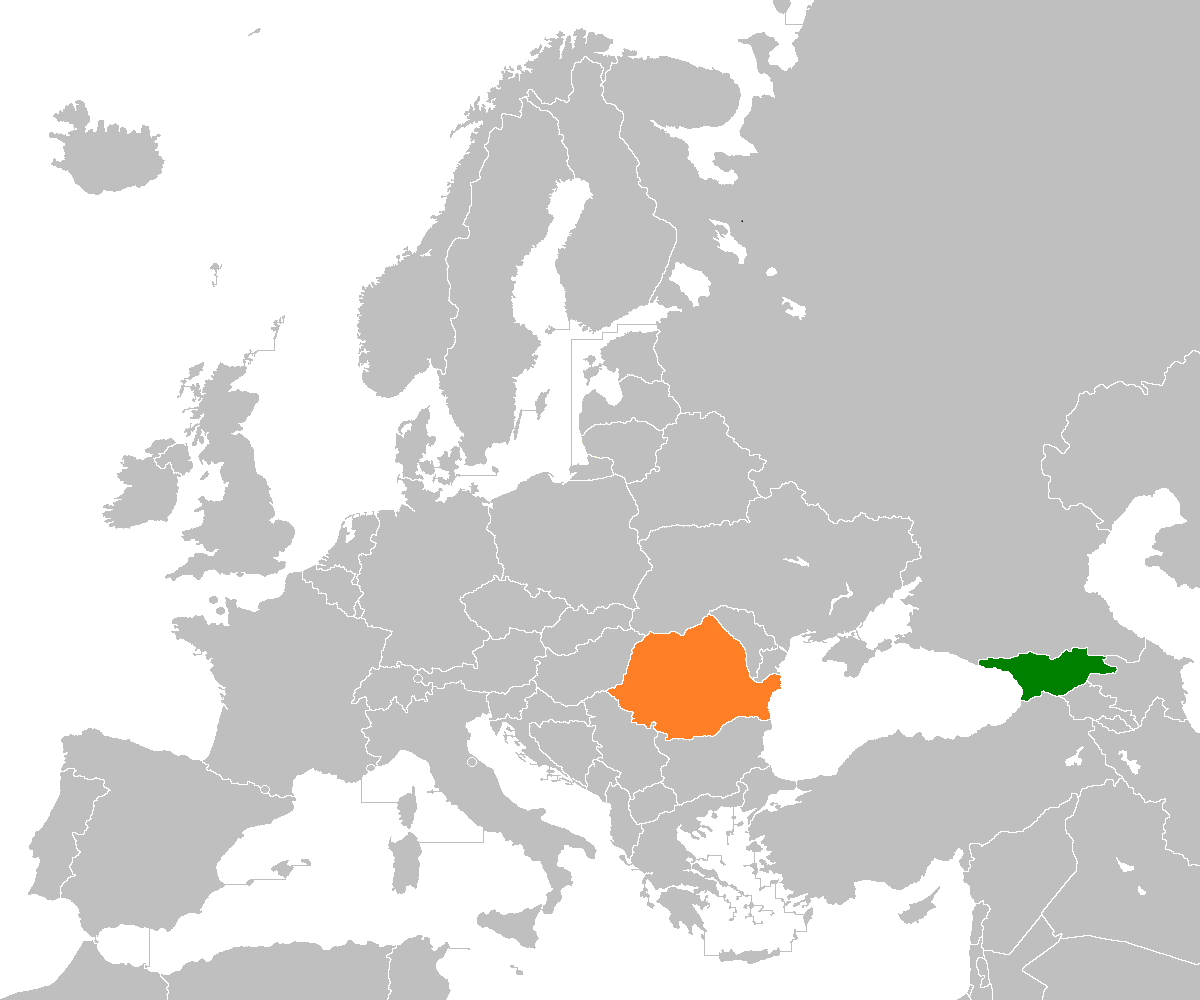
- Georgia: Romania

Georgia–Romania relations are the bilateral relations between Georgia and Romania. Georgia is represented through an embassy in Bucharest and a consulate in Constanța. Romania has an embassy in Tbilisi. Both countries officially established their diplomatic relations on 25 June 1992. Both countries are full members of the Organization of the Black Sea Economic Cooperation and Council of Europe. Romania joined the European Union in 2007, while Georgia is a candidate for EU accession.

Romania became the first country to recognize Georgia's independence, on 26 August 1991. Georgia and Romania, together with Azerbaijan, are part of the Azerbaijan–Georgia–Romania Interconnector (AGRI) project. This project aims to transport Azerbaijani natural gas to the Black Sea coast of Georgia, where it will be liquefied and taken to the Romanian Black Sea port of Constanța. From there, the gas will be taken to different parts of Europe. This project is expected to end by 2024–2026. It was started following the signing of a memorandum on 13 April 2010 by representatives of the three countries.

In 2021, the then Romanian ambassador to Georgia Răzvan Rotundu announced that Romania would donate 10,000 Oxford–AstraZeneca COVID-19 vaccine units to Georgia to help the country deal with the COVID-19 pandemic.

Anthim the Iberian is an important historical figure in Georgia and Romania and represents a symbol of the relations between these countries. He was a Georgian theologian born in the 17th century in the Kingdom of Kartli, then known as Iberia in Europe. He arrived at the Romanian principality of Wallachia in 1689, where he led the printing press of the prince of the country and became abbot of various monasteries. He printed and wrote many books and eventually became the Metropolitan of Wallachia, with his actions also reaching other regions as well, including his native Georgia. Anthim died in 1716. He was canonized by the Holy Synod of the Romanian Orthodox Church in 1992 (having 27 September as his saint day) and was commemorated by the same institution in 2016 when it declared that year as a homage year to Anthim. Romania is a member of the EU, which Georgia became candidate in 2023.

== Resident diplomatic missions ==
- Georgia has an embassy in Bucharest.
- Romania has an embassy in Tbilisi.

== See also ==
- Foreign relations of Georgia
- Foreign relations of Romania
- Georgia-NATO relations
- Georgia-EU relations
  - Accession of Georgia to the EU
