= Metropolis of Moldavia and Bukovina =

Subdivision of the Romanian Orthodox Church

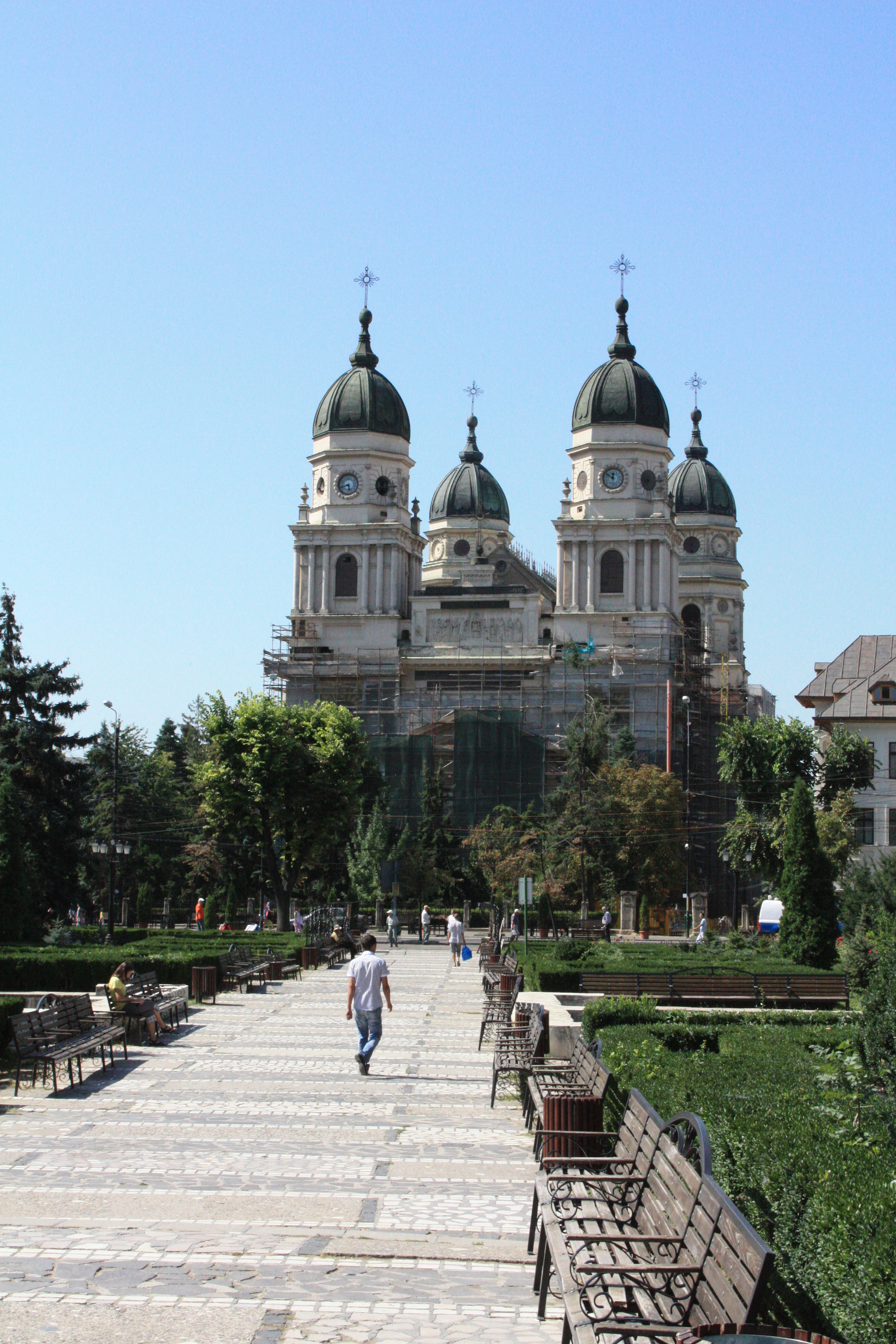
Metropolitan Cathedral in Iași

The Metropolis of Moldavia and Bucovina, in Iași, Romania, is a metropolis of the Romanian Orthodox Church.

== History ==
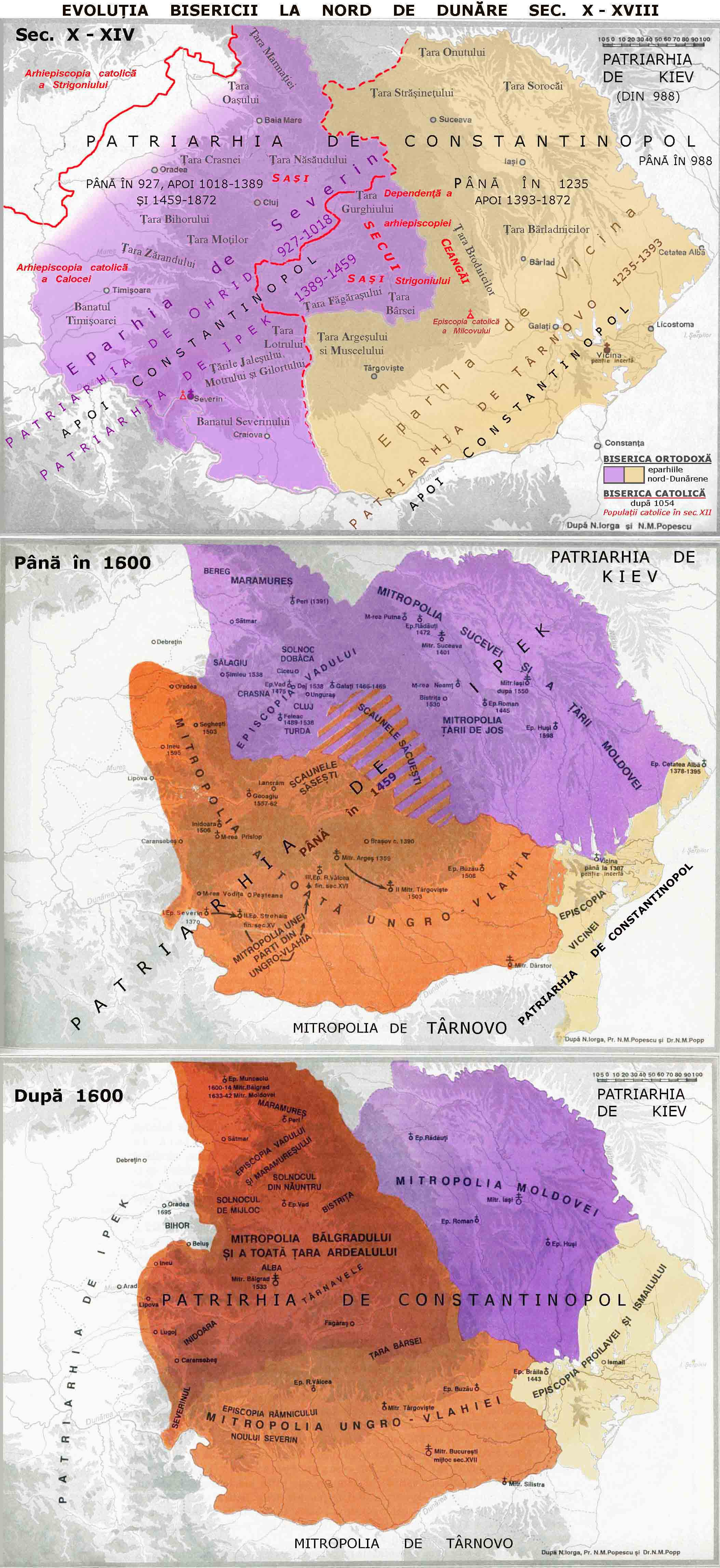
The history of the Orthodox church in the Romanian lands, 10-18th centuries

The Metropolis of Moldavia was set up in 1386 and recognized in 1401 by the Ecumenical Patriarchate of Constantinople as the Metropolis of Moldo-Wallachia. It had jurisdiction over all eparchies in the Principality of Moldavia.

In 1774, the Habsburg Monarchy annexed Bukovina, and by 1782 local bishop of Rădăuți transferred his seat to Chernivtsi. Already in 1783, he was detached from the ecclesiastical jurisdiction of the Metropolitan of Moldavia and transferred to the jurisdiction of the Metropolitanate of Karlovci.

In 1872, the Metropolis of Moldavia united with the Metropolis of Ungro-Wallachia to form the Romanian Orthodox Church.

== Administration and structure ==
The church is headed by the Archbishop of Iași and Metropolitan of Moldavia and Bucovina, Teofan Savu. It is divided into three archdioceses and one diocese.

=== Archdioceses and Archbishops ===
- Archdiocese of Iași: Teofan Savu (2008-)
- Archdiocese of Suceava and Rădăuți: Pimen Zainea (1991-)
- Archdiocese of Roman and Bacău: Eftimie Luca (1978-)

=== Dioceses and Bishops ===
- Diocese of Huși: Corneliu Onilă (2009-2017)

== List of Metropolitans ==
- 1401 Iosif Mușat
- 1436-1447 Damian
- 1447-1452 Ioachim
- 1452-1477 Teoctist I
- 1477-1508 Gheorghe I de Neamțu
- 1509-1528 Teoctist II
- 1528-1530 Calistrat
- 1530-1546 Teofan I
- 1546-1551 Grigorie Roșca
- 1551-1552 Gheorghe II de Bistrița
- 1552-1564 Grigorie II de la Neamț
- 1564-1572 Teofan II
- 1572-1577 Atanasie
- 1578-1579 Teofan II
- .../...
- 1582-1588 Teofan II
- 1588-1591 Gheorghe III Movilă
- 1591-1594 Nicanor
- 1595-1600 Gheorghe III Movilă
- 1600-1601 vacancy
- 1601-1605 Gheorghe III Movilă
- 1605-1608 Teodosie Barbovschi
- 1608-1629 Anastasie Crimca
- 1629-1632 Anastasie II
- 1632-1653 Varlaam Moţoc
- 1653-1659 Ghedeon
- 1659-1666 Sava

.../...

- 1670-1671 Ghedeon
- 1671-1674 Dosoftei Bărilă

.../...

- 1675-1686 Dosoftei Bărilă
- 1686-1689 Calistrat Vartic
- 1689-1701 Sava de la Roman

.../...

- 1708-1722 Ghedeon
- 1722-1730 Gheorghe IV
- 1730-1740 Antonie
- 1740-1750 Nechifor
- 1750-1760 Iacob Putneanul
- 1761-1786 Gavriil Callimachi
- 1786-1788 Leon Gheucă
- 1788-1792 Ambrozie Serebrenicov
- 1792-1803 Iacob Stamati
- 1803-1842 Veniamin Costache

.../...

- 1851-1860 Sofronie Miclescu
- 1865-1875 Calinic Miclescu
- 1875-1902 Iosif Naniescu
- 1902-1908 Partenie Clinceni
- 1909-1934 Pimen Georgescu
- 1934-1939 Nicodim Munteanu
- 1939-1947 Irineu Mihălcescu
- 1947-1948 Justinian Marina
- 1948-1950 vacancy
- 1950-1956 Sebastian Rusan
- 1957-1977 Iustin Moisescu
- 1977-1986 Teoctist Arăpașu
- 1986-1990 vacancy
- 1990-2007 Daniel Ciobotea
- from 2008 Teofan Savu

== See also ==
- Iași Metropolitan Cathedral
- Churches of Moldavia
- Metropolis of Bessarabia

== Sources ==
- Lascaris, Michel (1927). "Joachim, métropolite de Moldavie et les relations de l'Église moldave avec le Patriarchat de Peć et l'archevêché d'Achris au XVe siècle". Bulletin de la Section Historique: Académie Roumaine. 13: 129–159.
