= Varlaam Moțoc =

Metropolitan of Moldavia

Varlaam Metropolit.
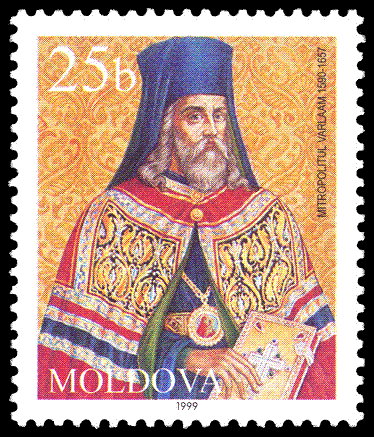
- Born: Vasile Moțoc Varlaam; Bolotești, Putna
- Died: 1657
- Occupation: Metropolitan of Moldavia (1632-1653)
- Notable work: Romanian Book of Learning

Varlaam Moțoc (Romanian pronunciation: [varlaˈam moˈt͡sok]) was the Metropolitan of Moldavia (1632-1653). He edited the Romanian Book of Learning in 1643.

== History ==
In 1643, the Moldavian Prince Vasile Lupu sponsored the Books of Homilies translated by Metropolitan of Moldavia Varlaam from Slavonic into Romanian (pre limba Romeniască) and titled Carte Românească de Învățătură (Romanian Book of Learning). The foreword by Prince Lupu says that it is addressed to the entire Romanian nation everywhere (la toată semenția românească de pretutindeni). The book, also known as "Cazania of Varlaam" (Varlaam's Homiliary), was the first ever printed in Moldavia and large numbers of copies spread in the neighboring provinces inhabited by Romanian speakers. The book was the first print of Moldavia. In 2015, his bust was installed on the Alley of Ecclesiastical Personalities in Chișinău; it was cast in bronze by sculptor Veaceslav Jiglițchi and placed on a pedestal made of Cosăuți stone, crafted by folk master Veaceslav Lozan.

== Books ==
- Cazania lui Varlaam, 1643
- Response to the Calvinist Catechism
