= Romanian Canadians =

Ethnic groups in Canada

Canadieni români (Romanian) Canadiens d'origine roumaine (French)
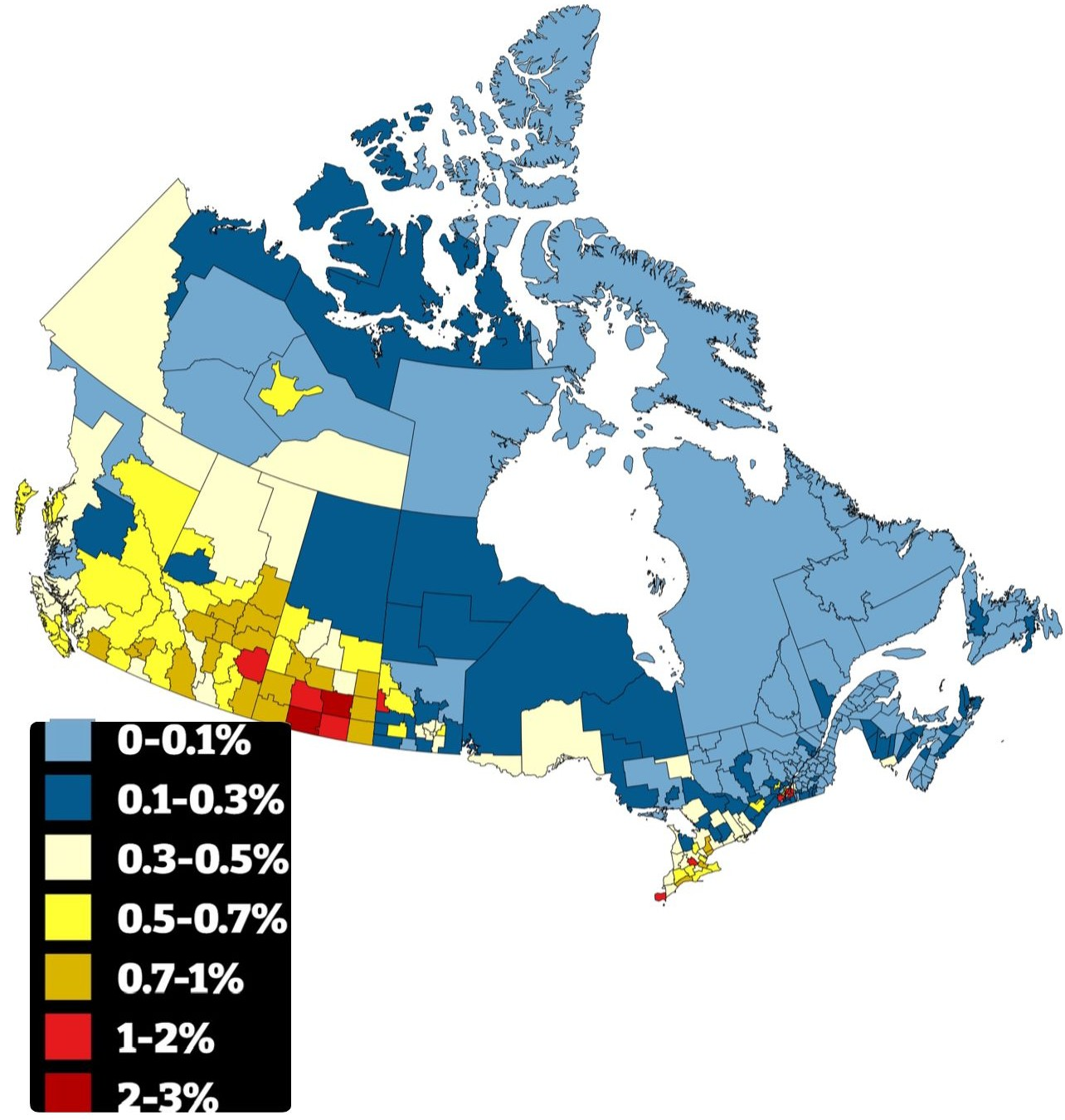
- Population distribution of Romanian Canadians by census division, 2021 census

Total population
- 215,885 (by ancestry, 2021 Census)

Regions with significant populations
- Greater Toronto Area, Greater Montreal

Languages
- Romanian, Canadian English, Canadian French

Religion
- Mainly Romanian Orthodoxy, but also Romanian Greek Catholicism, Roman Catholicism, Protestantism, Judaism

Related ethnic groups
- Romanian Americans, European Canadians

Romanian Canadians (French: Canadiens d'origine roumaine; Romanian: Canadieni români) are Canadian citizens of Romanian descent or Romania-born people who reside in Canada.

According to the 2021 Canadian census, there are 215,885 Romanian-Canadians.

== History of Romanian migration in Canada ==
=== Before World War I ===
Romanians moved to Canada in several periods. The first period was at the end of the 19th century and the beginning of the 20th century. Romanians had discovered Canada towards the end of the 19th century, after Clifford Sifton – Minister of Home Affairs representing a Liberal government that had promised to populate the West – had visited Bukovina. From 1896 to 1900, a group of Romanians established themselves in Assiniboia (now Saskatchewan), at Clifford Sifton's advice. The first two Romanian families that migrated to Canada from the Bukovina village of Boian stopped in Alberta in 1898. Other 100 Bucovina families took their example and followed them and they gave the settlement the name of their home village.

At the end of the 19th century and the beginning of the 20th century, many Romanians from the former Austro-Hungarian Empire (Transylvania, Bukovina, Banat, Crişana, and Maramureş) migrated to the Prairie provinces of Canada to work as farmers. The Dominion Lands Act encouraged homesteaders to come to the area. The migrants from the Romanian Old Kingdom were mostly Romanian Jews. Many Romanians moved to Canada and the United States between 1895 and 1920.

St Nicholas's Romanian Orthodox Church (established in 1902 in Regina) is the oldest Romanian Orthodox parish in North America; St George's Cathedral (founded in 1914 though the present building dates from the early 1960s), is the episcopal seat of the Romanian Orthodox Bishop of Regina. Today, the Romanian school from Boian, Alberta is a museum showcasing Romanian immigration, photos of the first Romanian settlers in the area and the typical Romanian farmer's life in rural Canada.

During the interwar period the number of ethnic Romanians who migrated to Canada decreased as a consequence of the economic development in Romania, but the number of Romanian Jews who migrated to Canada increased, mostly after the rise of the Iron Guard.

According to the 1911 Canadian census, in Canada lived 15,000 Romanians and in 1941: 25,000.

=== After World War II ===
The second period was between 1945 and 1955, when Romanians moved after World War II, during Communist Romania, at a time when Romania was in a difficult period in its history. In this period, 1,460,000 Romanian citizens left their country. Many of them were political refugees. Many of them left for Canada.

=== Post-communism ===
Another wave of Romanian emigration to Canada occurred after 1989 following the Romanian Revolution of 1989, when people obtained the right to leave Romania subsequent to the fall of Communism in Central and Eastern Europe. The wave intensified after the Mineriad of 13–15 June 1990. After 1998, for the fourth time, a large number of Romanians were leaving Europe to come to Canada.

In 2001, there were 131,830 Canadian residents who identified themselves of Romanian origin, of which 53,320 were single-origin Romanians and 78,505 were of mixed Romanian and other origins. The largest concentrations of Romanian-Canadians are in the Greater Toronto Area (approx. 75,000) and in the Greater Montreal Area (approx. 40,000). According to the 2001 Canadian census, the number of people of Romanian mother tongue in Canada was 50,895 and 61,330 Canadians claimed to speak Romanian. The number of people born in Romania was 61,330 and 2,380 were born in Moldova.

According to the 2016 census, there were 238,050 Canadian residents who identified themselves of Romanian origin, of which 96,910 were single-origin Romanians and 141,145 were of mixed Romanian and other origins. Almost 100,000 Romanian Canadians live in Ontario.

According to the 2021 census, there were 215,885 Canadian residents declaring themselves of Romanian origin; Romanian was the mother tongue of 93,160 of Canadian residents. There were 86,770 Canadian residents who were born in Romania.

Immigration from Romania reached a high in the early 2000s. Figures from Citizenship and Immigration Canada show that the annual number of new permanent residents from Romania increased from an average of over 3,700 per year in the late 1990s to an average of over 5,500 per year since 2001, peaking in 2004 at 5,658. After 2004, the immigration from Romania constantly decreased.

Map of North America highlighting the OCA Romanian Episcopate

Romanian immigrants to Canada
Year	Number of people
1995	3,851
1996	3,670
1997	3,916
1998	2,976
1999	3,468
2000	4,431
2001	5,589
2002	5,688
2003	5,466
2004	5,658
2005	4,964
2006	4,468
2007	3,834
2008	2,836
2009	2,076
2010	1,922
2011	1,776
2012	1,588
2013	1,512
2014	1,552
2015	1,183
2016	1,361
2017	980
2018	810
2019	675

Source: Citizenship and Immigration Canada, 2014:, 2015: Facts and Figures 2016:

== Community life and associations ==
A few parishes and non-profit organizations deal with a series of community related issues. These include the "Buna Vestire" Parish Montreal, the Romanian Association of Canada, the Federation of Romanian Associations of Canada, Women's Society, and Constantin Brancoveanu Society.

In 1914-18 was built the "Buna Vestire" Church (Annunciation Church) (Cernăuți Metropolitan seat), the oldest Romanian Orthodox Church in Montreal. Among the Buna Vestire Church priests were Jida, Glicherie Moraru (1930–1938), Constantin Juga (1938–1950), Petre Popescu (June 10, 1951 – 2003), and Nicolae Stoleru, Tofan.

In 1939, on Iberville Street, in Montreal, was built "Casa Romana", where was set up a Romanian school.

In 1957, was set up the Romanian Cultural Association of Hamilton, Ontario. Cuvântul românesc is the newspaper of the association. "The Week of the Romanians" continues the tradition of almost 40 years of the "Romanian Field Week" at Hamilton, Ontario. Through the years, the place has combined cultural tributes to Romania with anticommunist manifestations from Romanians in North America. The Romanian Field covers 40 acres (160,000 m^{2}) in a natural environment near Hamilton. The place features the Nae Ionescu Cultural Center, the St. Mary Chapel, sports fields, a pool, as well as a couple of bungalows and accommodation for mobile homes. The place for the St. Mary Chapel was chosen by Valerian Trifa. The Writers' Alley (Rotonda) includes busts (sculptor Nicăpetre (1936–2008) of Nae Ionescu, Vasile Posteucă, George Donev, Aron Cotruş, Vintilă Horia, Mircea Eliade and Mihai Eminescu.

Another recreational and Romanian cultural facility in Canada is the Camp at Fort Qu'Appelle, Saskatchewan. Although not quite completed, the camp was blessed and opened for use by Archbishop Valerian Trifa in the summer of 1971.

On July 24, 1998, the Romanian community of Boian, Alberta celebrated its centenary. Besides religious services, there was a cultural program and demonstrations of the early life of the Romanians in Canada. The Romanian Orthodox parish in Boian has a Romanian ethnic museum housed on its premises. The museum and St. Mary Orthodox Church was proclaimed historical site by the authorities.

The Association of Romanian Writers in Canada was incorporated in 2001. The Association of Romanian Engineers in Canada was founded in 2003.

=== Timeline ===
- 1896-1900 – A group of Romanians established themselves to the Saskatchewan, at Clifford Sifton's advice.
- 1898 – The first two Romanian families that migrated to Canada from the Bukovina village of Boian stopped in Alberta. They gave the settlement the name Boian, Alberta.
- 1939 – On Iberville Street, in Montreal, was built "Casa Romana", where was set up a Romanian school.
- 1952 – The Romanian Association of Canada (A.R.C.) founded in Montreal by Gheorghe Loghiade ( -1986), Gheorghe Stanciu, Petre Sultana, Miron Georgescu, Nichita Tomescu, Florin Marghescu, Ion Ţăranu (1921–2009), Alexandru Fonta (1922–2004) and Mihai Pop. The association was incorporated in 1953.
- 1965 – The Romanian Association of Canada launches fund raising events in order to build the Romanian Orthodox Church "Buna Vestire", situated on Cristoph Colomb Street in Montreal.
- 1970 – launches fund raising events to help flood victims in Romania.
- 1970 – Alexandru Fonta (1922–2004), Vasile Posteucă (1912–1972) and Jean Țăranu (1921–2009) donate a piece of land known today as "The Romanian Camp" in Val-David, Quebec. In 1980 in Val-David are inaugurated two Romanian landmarks, the Predeal-Trudeau Street and the Romanians Bridge.
- 1971 – A.R.C. launches the first Romanian Radio Show called "Ora de radio". Since 1999 the show airs with a different name, under the supervision of the Federation of Romanian Associations of Canada (F.A.R.).
- 1973 – A.R.C. participates at The Folk Festival in Baie-Saint-Paul, Quebec, taking 1st place in the competition.
- 1974 – A.R.C. joins other Romanian community associations to form the Federation of Romanian Associations of Canada (F.A.R.).
- 1981 – Together with other organizations - Buna Vestire Parish, Women's Society, Constantin Brancoveanu Society, Romanian Radio Show and F.A.R. Canada - A.R.C. launches a series of fundraising events to build The Romanian Cultural Center. F.A.R. obtains a grant of $100.000 from the Quebec Government for the construction of the center. The money were given to F.A.R. in the name of the Romanian Community of Montreal and all its members.
- 1988 – A.R.C. creates the first Romanian TV Show called "Tele-Roumanie".
- 1997 – new lyrics for the Canadian song "Maple Leaf Forever" by the Romanian Canadian Vladimir Radian: "CBC Radio's Metro Morning show in Toronto ran a contest to find new lyrics for the song in 1997. The contest was won by Romanian immigrant, mathematician, and now a songwriter, actor and poet, Vladimir Radian, who moved to Canada in the 1980s. This version received its first full orchestral treatment on June 27, 1997, at a concert by the Toronto Symphony Orchestra."
- 2000 – A.R.C. resigns from F.A.R. Canada after illegal elections are held by this Association on October 5, 1999.
- 2001 – A.R.C. and Nova.TR (The Young Romanians Association) launch a pilot project to help new immigrants upon their arrival. The project helped about 40 families of newcomers, offering them a low cost housing for a period of two weeks. The project came to an end a year later, due to lack of funds. In 2002, A.R.C. accepts the assimilation request of Nova.TR
- 2001 – In March, the first issue of the Romanian newspaper Pagini Romanesti (Romanian Pages) at Montréal. The newspaper was printed after the closing of an older magazine, Luceafarul. Pagini Romanesti is still printed being today the oldest newspaper of the Romanian community in Québec.
- 2003 – A.R.C. celebrates 50 years of existence with a series of cultural and social events.
- 2003 – On June 11, 2006, a bust of Mihai Eminescu was unveiled at Saint George Church, Windsor, Ontario.

== Gallery ==
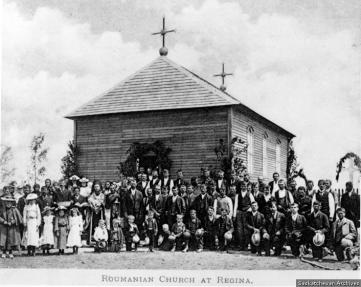
Romanians in front of the Romanian Orthodox Church of Regina, the first Romanian church in North America (1904)

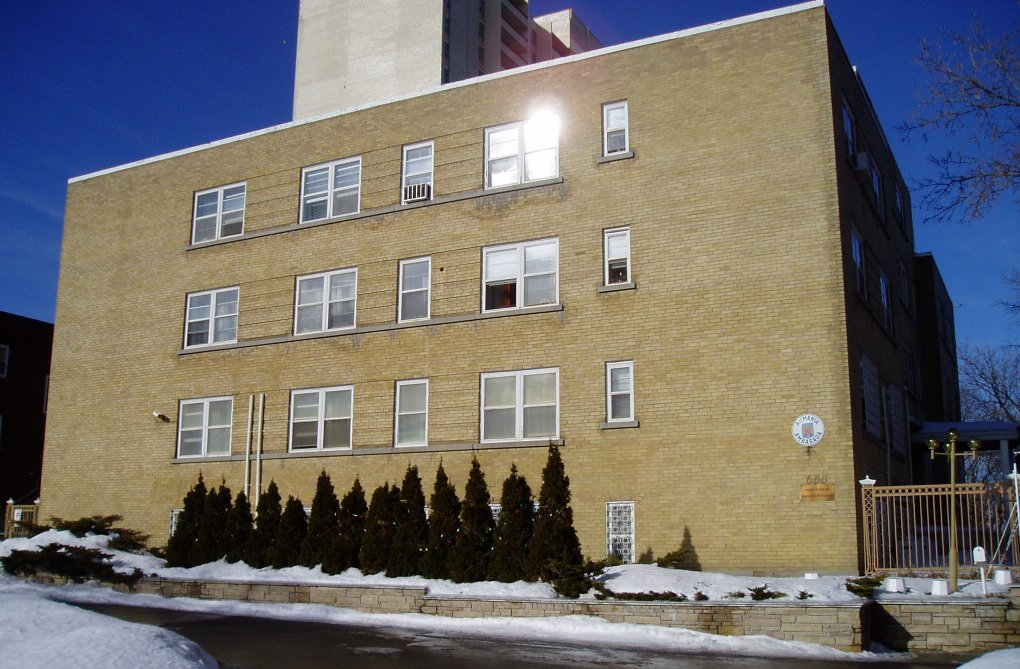
Embassy of Romania in Ottawa

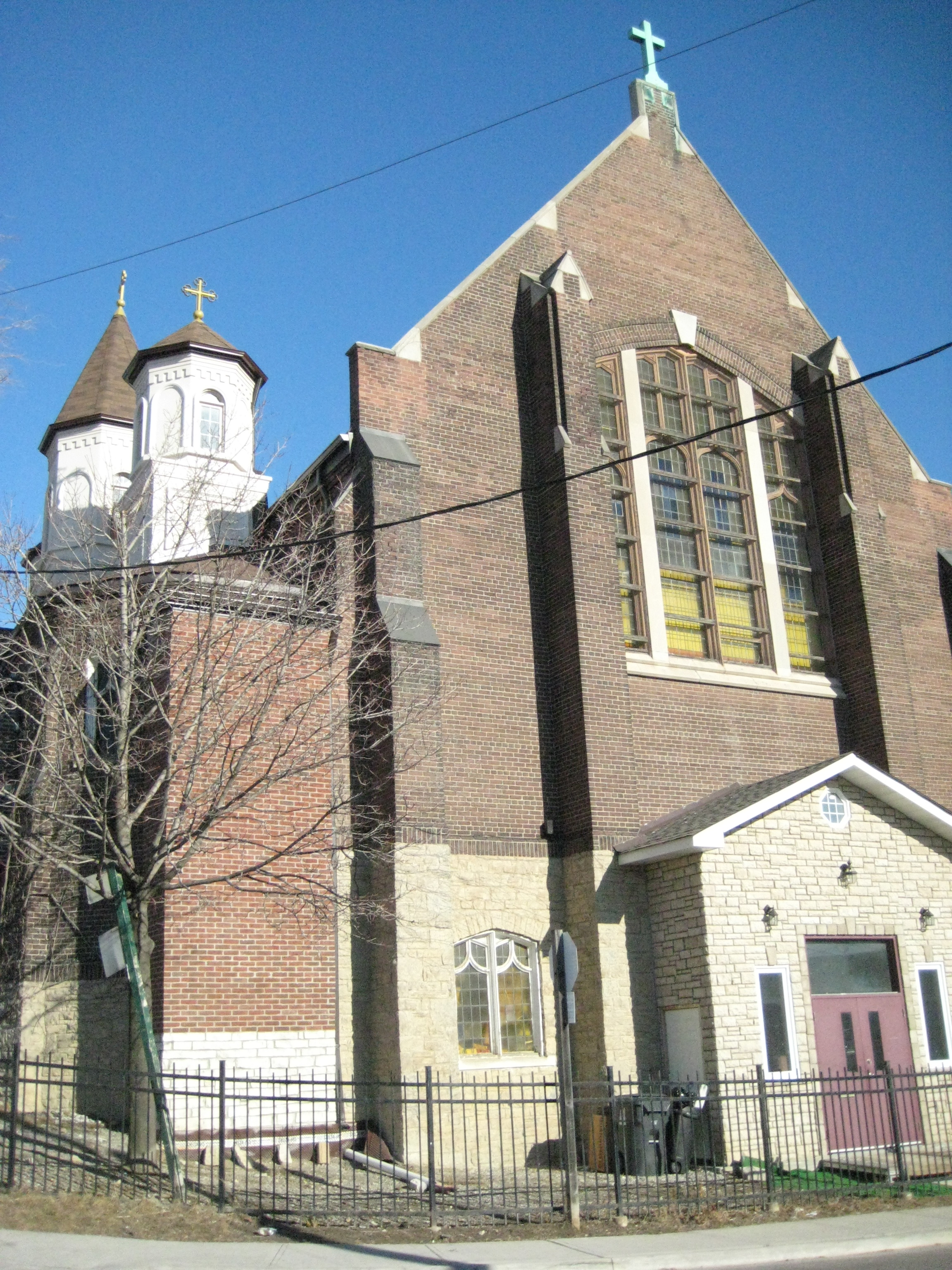
St. George's Romanian Orthodox Church in Toronto

Toronto Romanian Festival

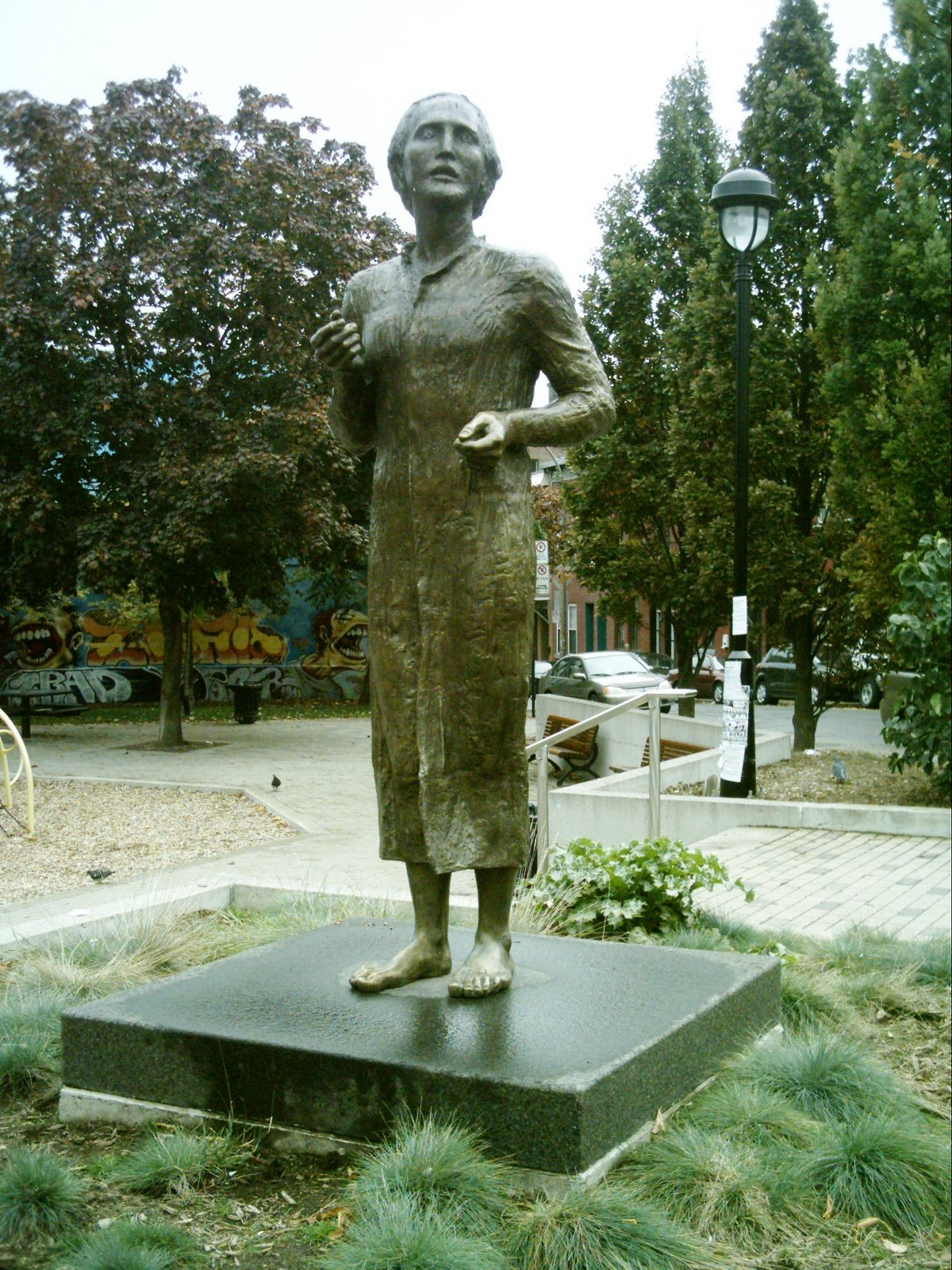
Statue of Mihai Eminescu, Montreal

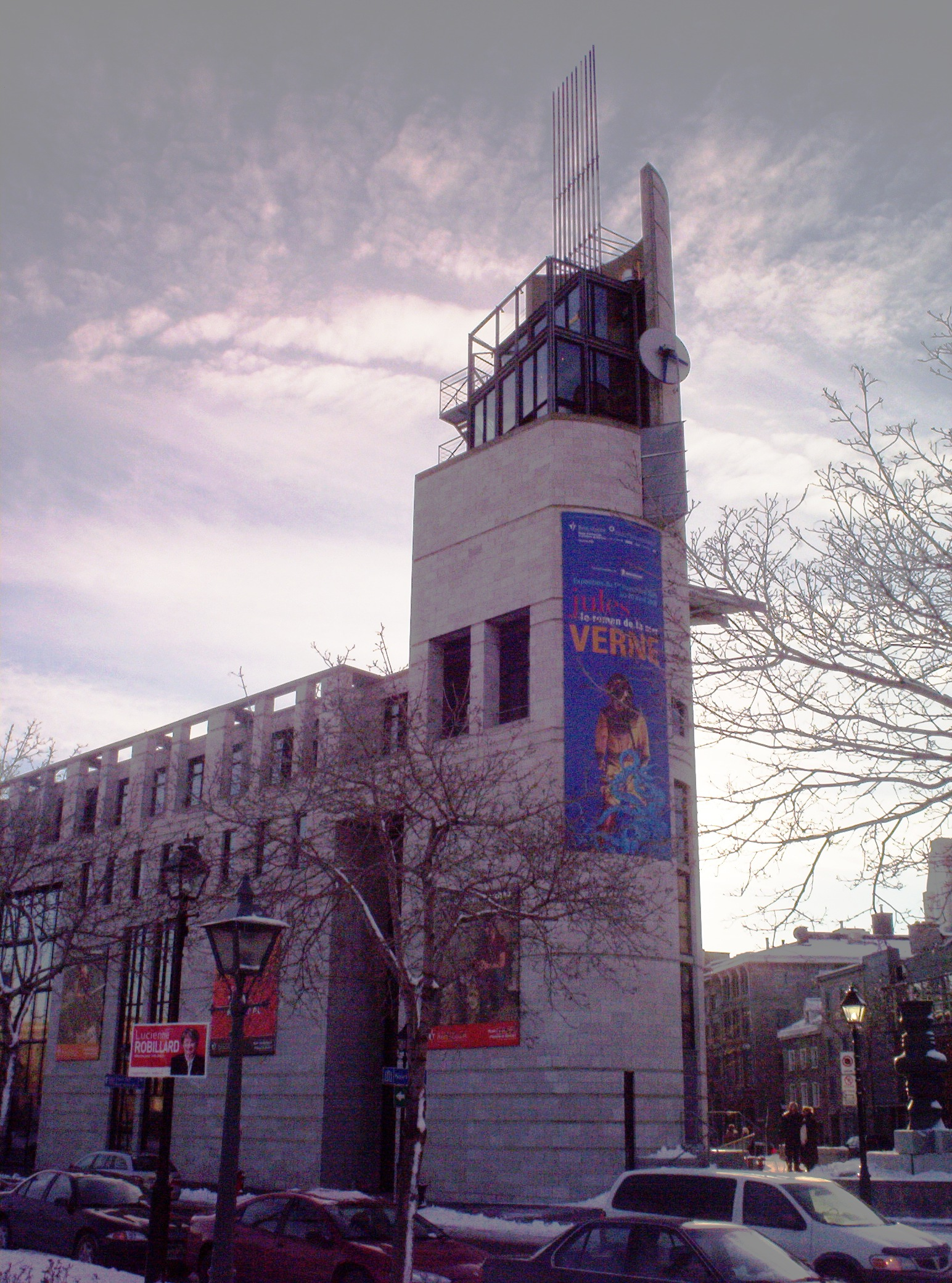
Dan Hanganu's Éperon building, Pointe-à-Callière Museum

=== Romanian Canadians by Canadian province or territory (2016) ===
Province	Population	Percentage	Source
Ontario	98,235	0.7%	
Quebec	53,060	0.7%	
Alberta	34,230	0.9%	
British Columbia	31,250	0.7%	
Saskatchewan	12,730	1.2%	
Manitoba	5,835	0.5%	
Nova Scotia	1,195	0.1%	
New Brunswick	940	0.1%	
Newfoundland and Labrador	185	0.0%	
Prince Edward Island	125	0.1%	
Northwest Territories	120	0.3%	
Nunavut	15	0.0%	
Yukon	135	0.4%	
Canada	238,050	0.7%	

=== Religion ===
Romanian Canadian demography by religion
Religious group	2021 (Note: Religious breakdown proportions based on "Romanian" ethnic or cultural origin response on the 2021 census.)		2001 (Note: Religious breakdown proportions based on "Romanian" ethnic or cultural origin response on the 2001 census.)	
Religious group	Pop.	%	Pop.	%
Christianity	137,615	63.74%	103,255	78.32%
Irreligion	61,400	28.44%	18,495	14.03%
Judaism	14,180	6.71%	9,240	7.01%
Islam	600	0.28%	200	0.15%
Buddhism	290	0.13%	180	0.14%
Hinduism	85	0.04%	35	0.03%
Indigenous spirituality	80	0.04%	150	0.11%
Sikhism	15	0.01%	10	0.01%
Other	1,315	0.61%	255	0.19%
Total Romanian Canadian population	215,885	100%	131,830	100%

Romanian Canadian demography by Christian sects
Religious group	2021		2001	
Religious group	Pop.	%	Pop.	%
Catholic	28,630	20.8%	25,810	25%
Orthodox	68,150	49.52%	40,490	39.7%
Protestant	24,205	17.59%	31,930	30.92%
Other Christian	16,630	12.08%	4,525	4.38%
Total Romanian Canadian Christian population	137,615	100%	103,255	100%

== List of notable Romanian Canadians ==
References for the descent and/or birthplace of each individual can be found in their respective articles.

=== Academia ===
- Tudor Bompa – professor emeritus at York University in Toronto
- Mihai Ioan Botez – professor of neurology at University of Montreal
- Aurel Braun – professor of International Relations and Political Science at the University of Toronto
- Florin Diacu – mathematician at University of Victoria
- Lila Kari – professor of computer science and of biochemistry at the University of Western Ontario
- Lavinia Stan – professor of political science at St. Francis Xavier University
- Mircea Steriade – professor of neuroscience at Université Laval in Quebec
- Lucian Turcescu – professor of theology at Concordia University
- Ela Veresiu – assistant professor of marketing at York University's Schulich School of Business

=== Architecture ===
- Dan Hanganu (received the Order of Canada)

=== Art ===
- Lilian Broca – visual artist
- Sorel Etrog – sculptor (received the Order of Canada)
- Betty Goodwin – sculptor and painter
- Gilles Mihalcean – sculptor
- Joe Rosenthal – sculptor

=== Business ===
- Murray Koffler – founder of Shoppers Drug Mart
- Murray Pezim (1920–1998) – former owner of BC Lions
- Calin Rovinescu – former president and CEO of Air Canada
- Michel Vulpe – entrepreneur and inventor, founder of i4i

=== Fashion ===
- Steven Cojocaru – fashion critic
- Irina Lazareanu – model

=== Film and television ===
- Neil Grayston – actor
- Paul Kligman – actor
- Tatiana Maslany – actress
- Ann Pirvu – actress
- Kayla Rivera – actress and singer
- Elysia Rotaru – actress and voice artist
- Maïla Valentir – actress

=== Journalism ===
- Normand Lester
- David Oancia
- Lawrence Solomon

=== Literature ===
- Oana Avasilichioaei – poet
- Irving Layton – poet
- Nina Munteanu – novelist
- Kenneth Radu – novelist

=== Music ===
- Maya Badian – composer
- Paul Bley – pianist (received the Order of Canada)
- Serban Ghenea – audio engineer and mixer
- Teo Gheorghiu – pianist
- Simina Grigoriu – DJ and producer
- Corey Hart – singer
- Lisa Patterson – multi-instrumentalist, songwriter, producer
- Ester Peony – singer and songwriter, Eurovision Song Contest 2019 participant
- Nestor Pistor – singer and comedian

=== Politics ===
- Corneliu Chisu – former MP for Pickering-Scarborough East
- Gary Filmon – former premier of Manitoba
- David Iftody – former MP for Provencher
- George Mihalcheon – provincial politician, member of Legislative Assembly of Alberta
- Ion Păscăluță – former member of Sfatul Țării, who emigrated to Canada during the Communist rule in Romania
- Magda Popeanu – current councillor for the City of Montreal
- William Yurko – former MLA, former MP for Edmonton East

=== Sports ===
- Bianca Andreescu – tennis player
- Ben Bassarab – wrestler
- Lucian Bute – boxer
- Alex Comsia – soccer player
- Theo Corbeanu – soccer player
- Aurora Cotop – figure skater
- Ion Croitoru – wrestler
- Adrian Diaconu – boxer
- Leonard Doroftei – boxer; lightweight world champion
- Mathew Dumba – ice hockey player
- Andrei Dumitru – soccer player
- Ecaterina Guica – judoka
- Ionuţ Dan Ion – boxer
- Carmen Ionesco – discus thrower and shot putter
- Joffrey Lupul – ice hockey player
- Petre Mândru – soccer coach
- Alex Mateas – Canadian football player
- Dylan Moscovitch – pair skater
- Ana Padurariu – artistic gymnast
- Silviu Petrescu – soccer referee
- Horatio Pintea – table tennis player
- Erik Pop – soccer player
- Marina Radu – water polo player
- Roy Radu – rugby union player
- Robert Rositoiu – soccer coach
- Chris Serban – soccer player
- Daniel Stanese – soccer player
- Yannick Tifu – ice hockey player
- Waldo Von Erich – wrestler

=== Other ===
- Alexandra Botez – chess player and Twitch.tv streamer
- Andrea Botez – chess player and Twitch.tv streamer
- Roberto Dutesco – photographer and filmmaker
- Kripparrian – Twitch.tv streamer; YouTube content creator
- Daniel Negreanu – professional poker player
- Jerry S.T. Pitzul – judge advocate general for the Canadian Forces
- Catherine Pogonat – radio and television host
- Doina Precup – computer scientist
- Razvan Preotu – chess player
- Alec Sehon – immunologist
- Christine Dumitriu Van Saanen – educator and geologist
- Jacob Viner – economist
- Matei Zaharia – computer scientist

== See also ==
- Canada–Romania relations
- European Canadians
- Romanian Americans
- Boian, Alberta
- Romanian Orthodox Metropolis of the Americas
- The Romanian Orthodox Episcopate of America
