= Vulpești =

Vulpeşti may refer to several villages in Romania:

- Vulpeşti, a village in Buzoești Commune, Argeș County
- Vulpeşti, a village in Dobroteasa Commune, Olt County

and to a village in Moldova:

- Vulpeşti, a village in Mănoileşti Commune, Ungheni district

== See also ==
- Vulpe, Vulpea, Vulpescu - Romanian family names
