= Armenian Church, Iași =

Heritage site in Iași County, Romania

Coordinates: 47°09′45″N 27°35′20″E

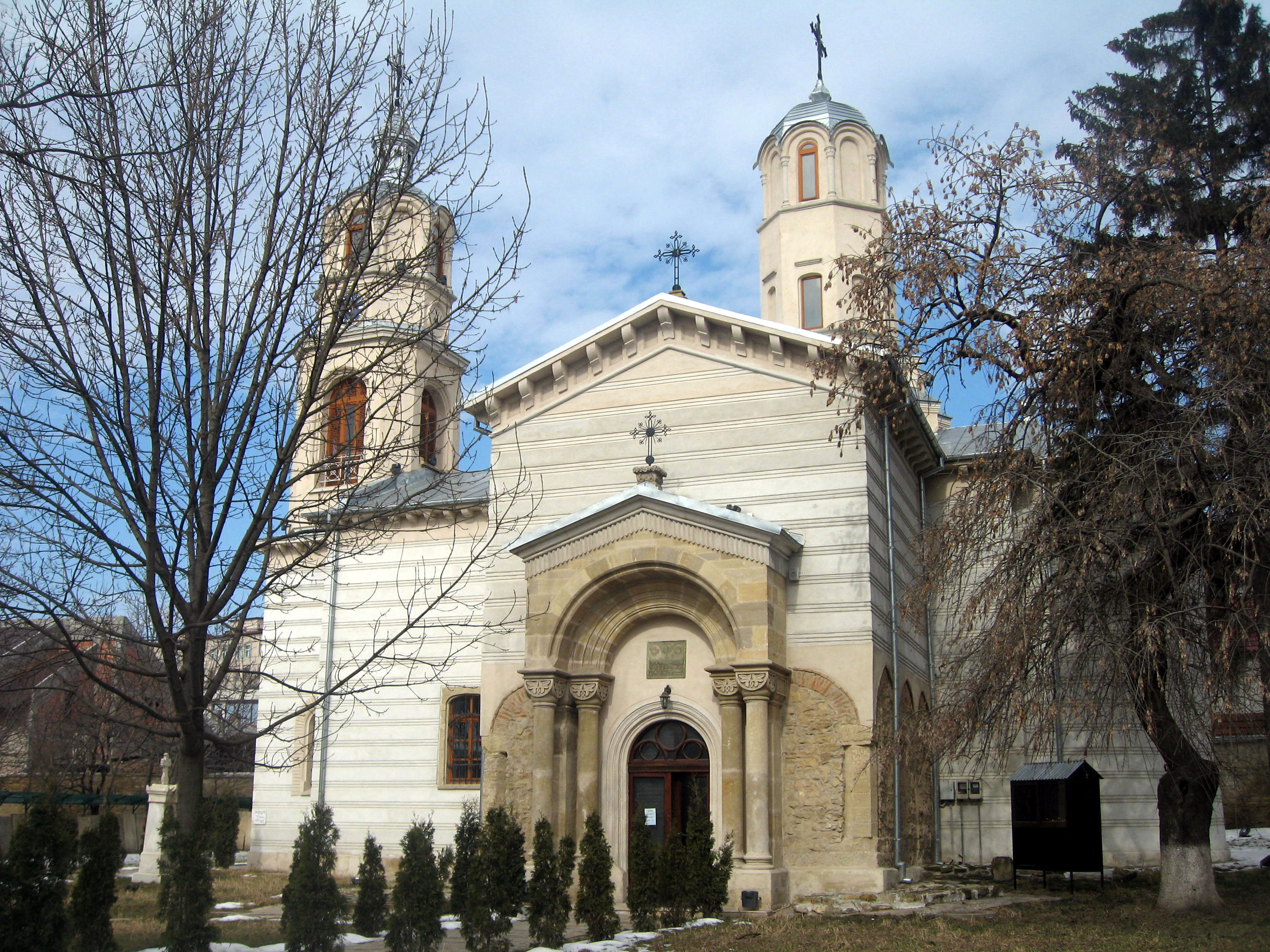
Armenian Church

The Armenian Church of Iași (Romanian: Biserica Armeană Sfânta Născătoare) is an Armenian Apostolic church located at 22 Armeană Street in Iași, Romania. It is dedicated to the Virgin Mary.

It is known for certain that the church was restored in 1803. The inscription found on an old brick in the transept, which includes the date 1395, has given rise to much commentary that has not shed light on the building's prior existence. The Armenian community used neither the Julian nor the Gregorian dating system at the time, and neither did the Romanians, leading to the conclusion that the inscription is a later forgery. However, it is true that Armenians built a church in Iași, dedicated to the Dormition of the Mother of God, in the 14th century. It appears to have existed in 1583-1586, when it drew the attention of a foreign visitor.

According to tradition, the neighboring Saint Sabbas Church was built on the site of an Armenian church taken by the Romanian Orthodox. A second Armenian church, dedicated to Saint Gregory the Great, burned in 1827. There is evidence that Princes Mihai Racoviță, Nicholas Mavrocordatos and Dimitrie Cantemir granted tax exemptions to the clergy of the two parishes. Around 1830-1832, an old Armenian cemetery existed behind the Vulpe Church. It was used for those who died during epidemics and could not be buried around the city churches.

The church has three bells, of which two are dated. A small one has a Latin inscription from 1607, and a larger one is written in Old Church Slavonic in 1887. Repairs were carried out in 1732, 1803 (from the foundations), 1929-1932 and, following World War II bombardment, 1946.

The church is listed as a historic monument by Romania's Ministry of Culture and Religious Affairs, as is the neighboring Armenian atheneum, built in 1932 and now used as the parish house.

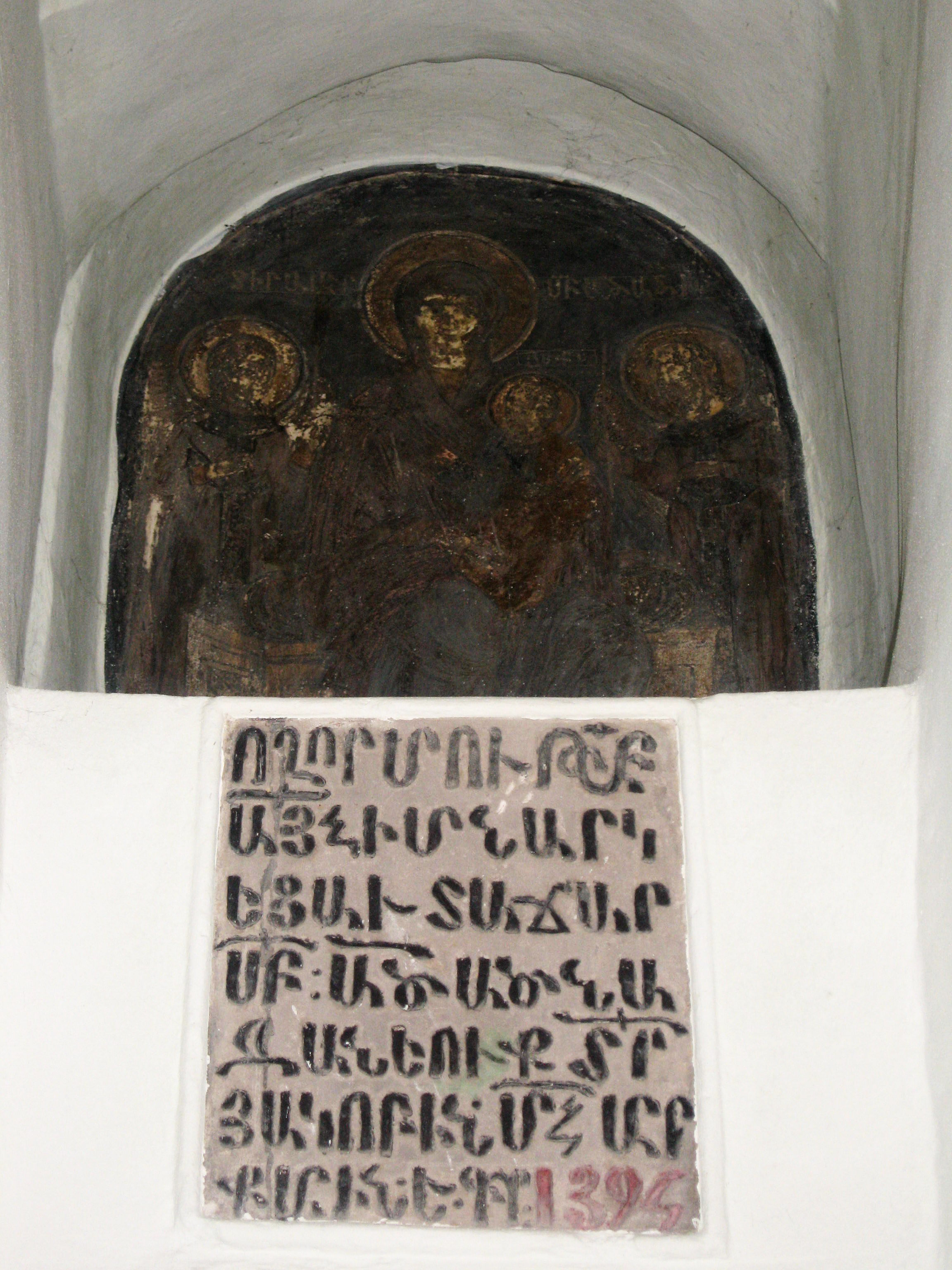
Niche with the 1395 inscription

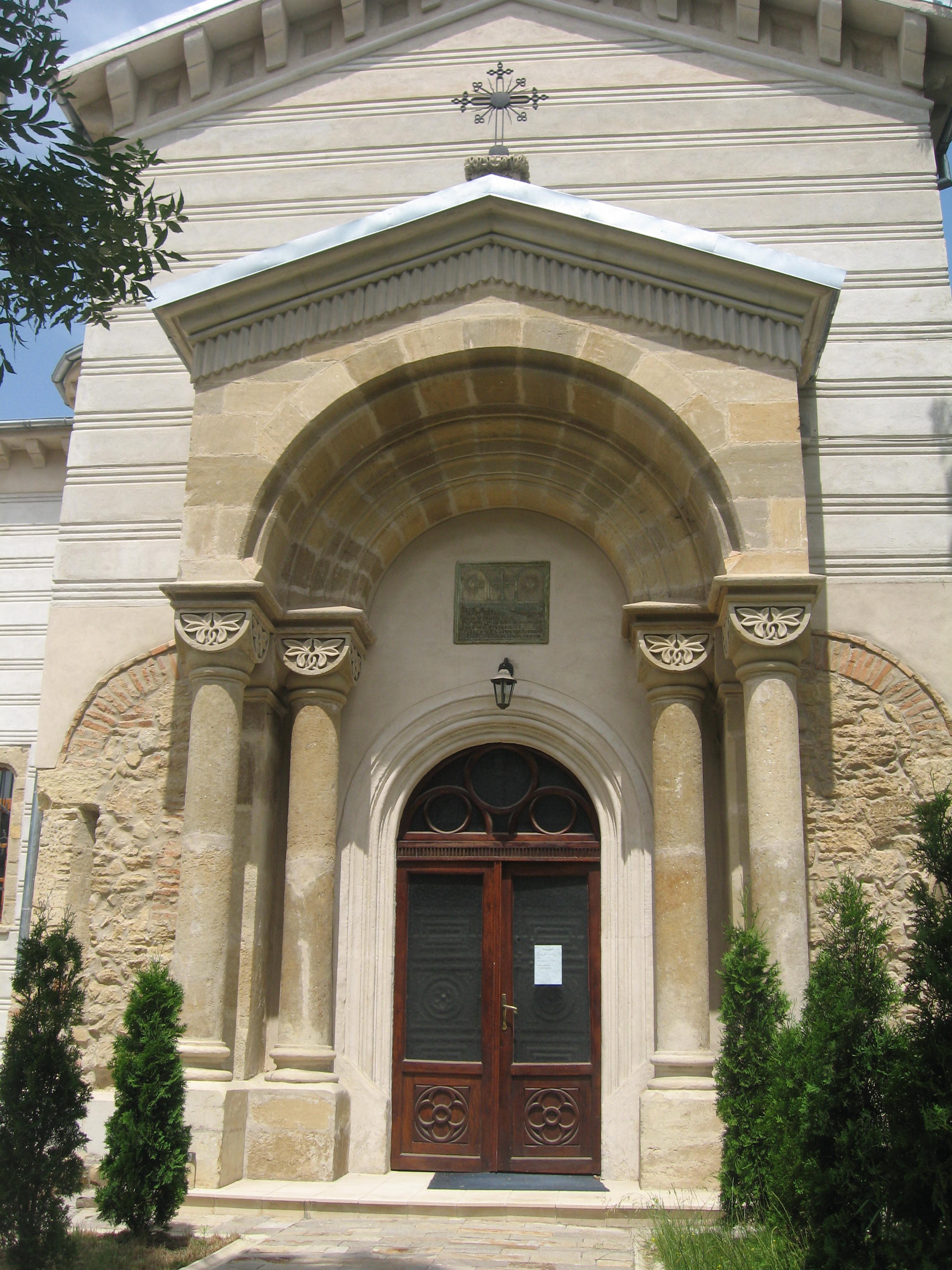
Entrance

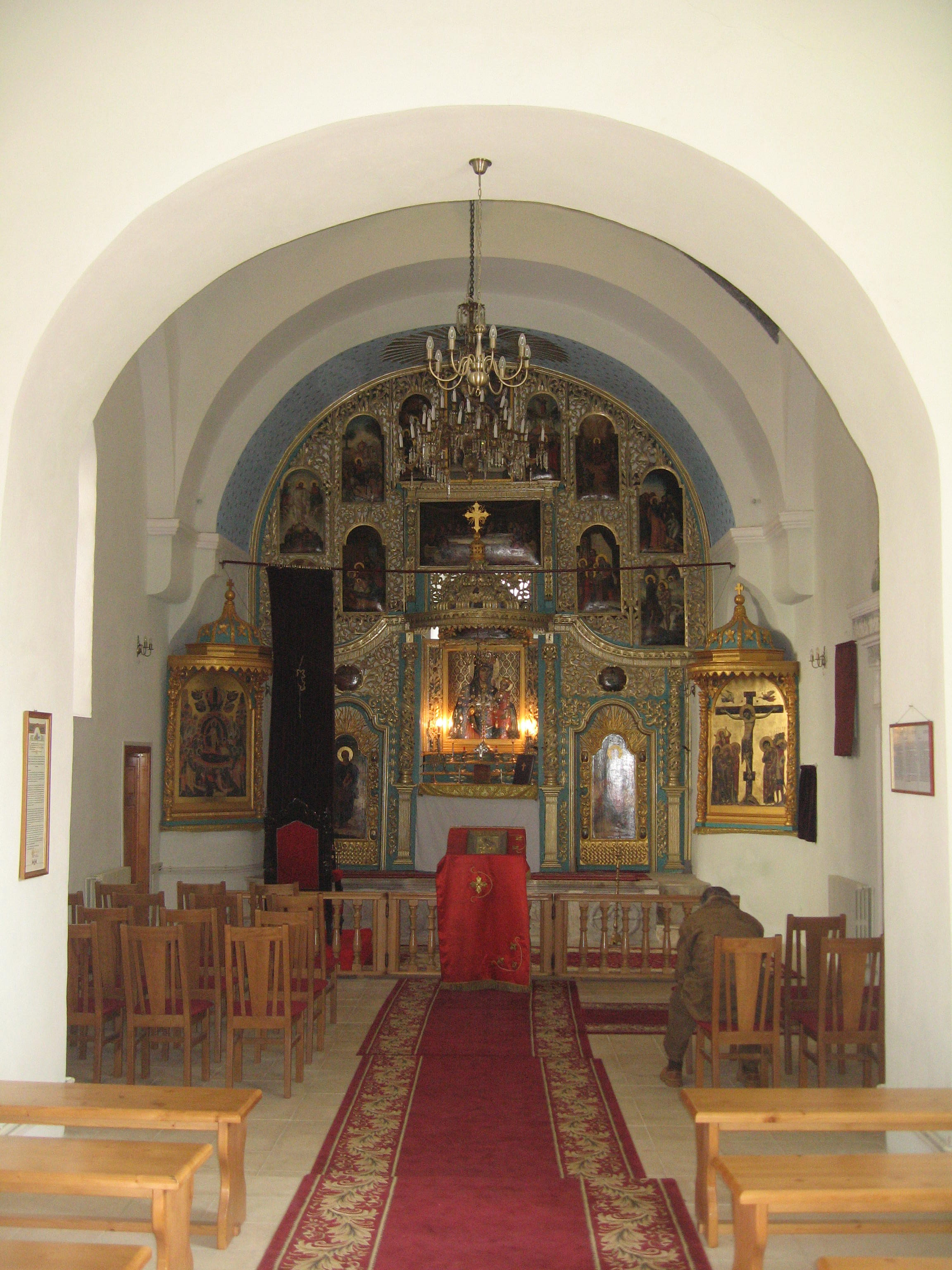
Iconostasis

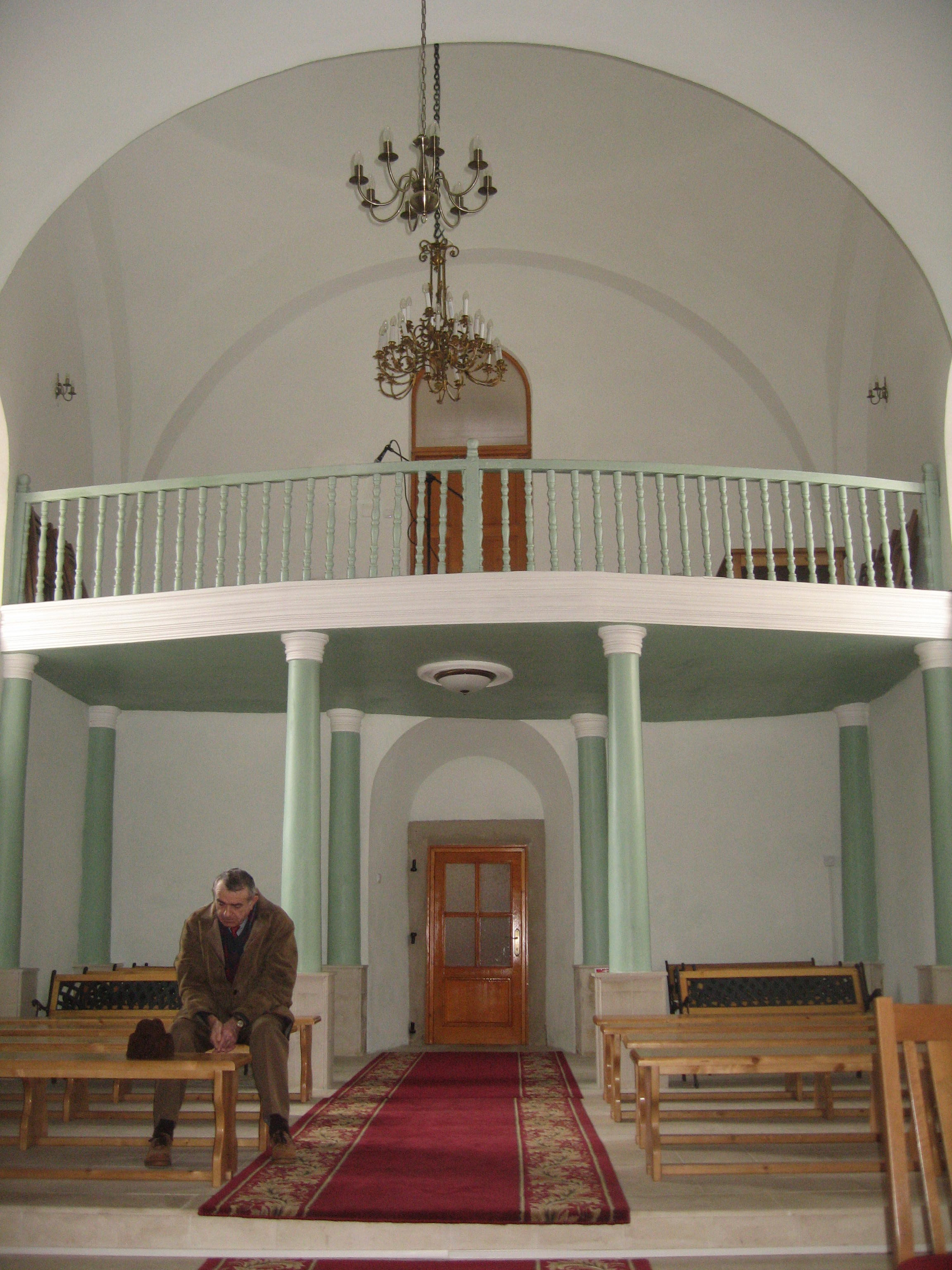
Choir

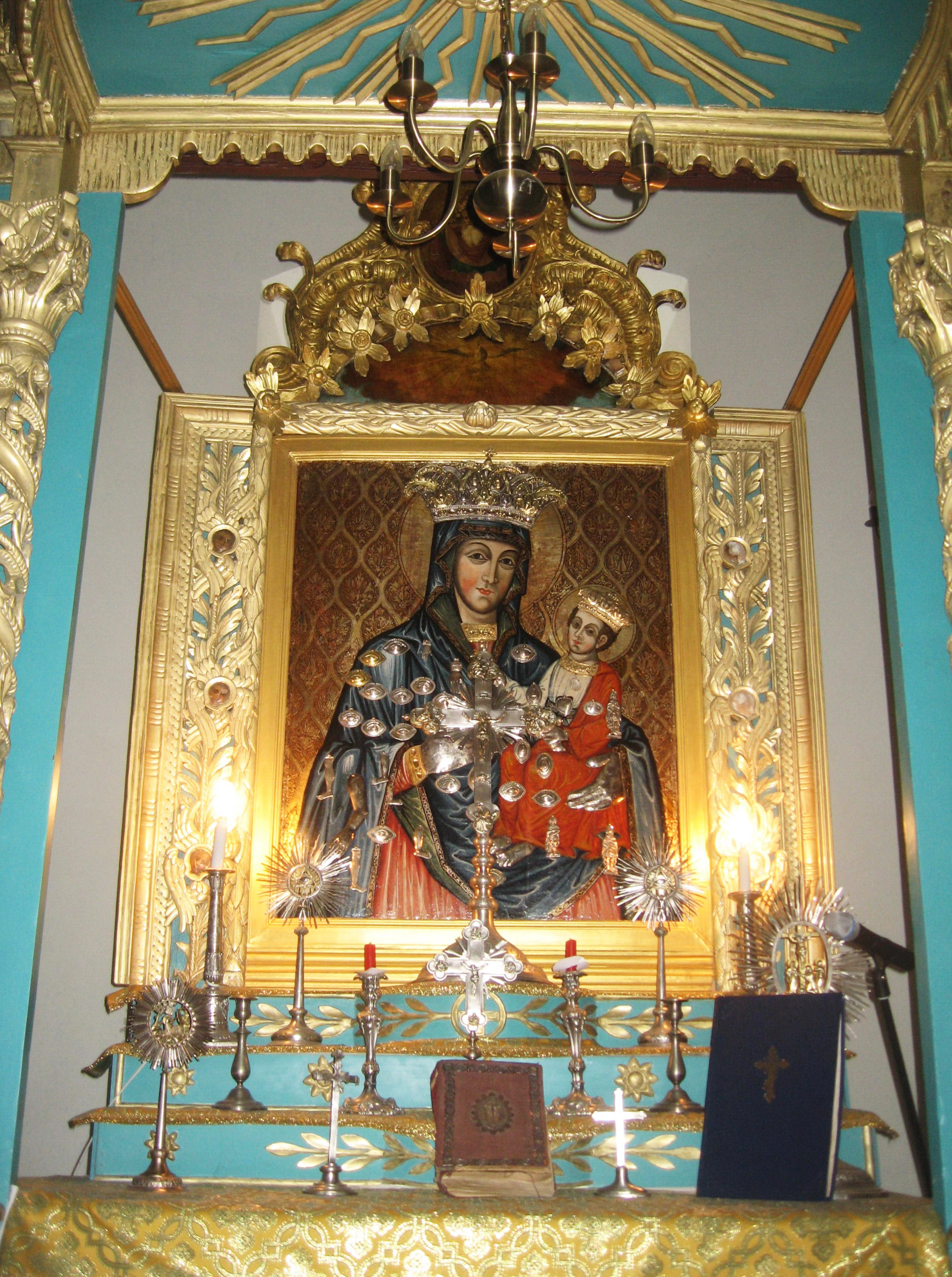
Madonna and Child icon

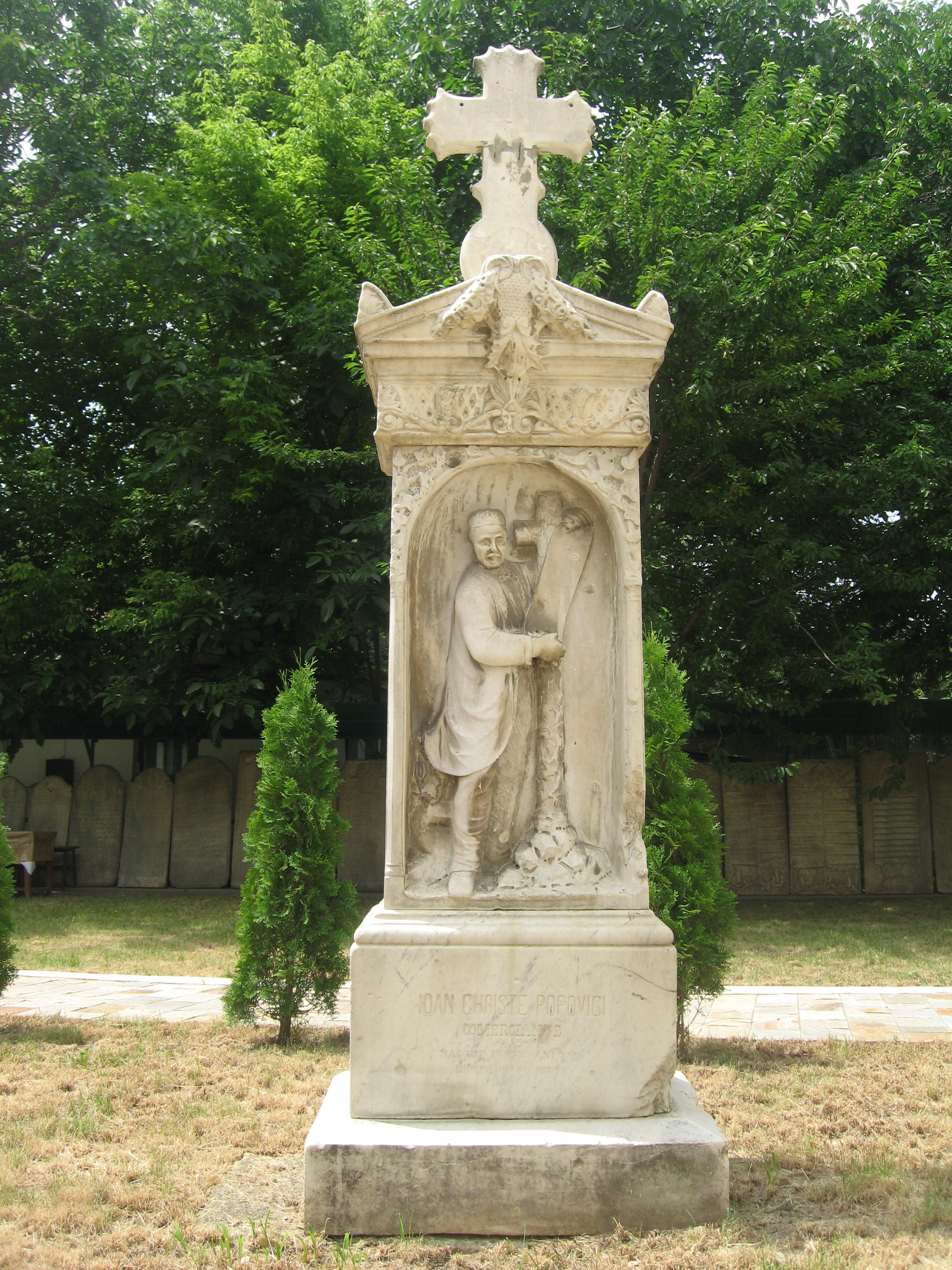
Merchant's grave

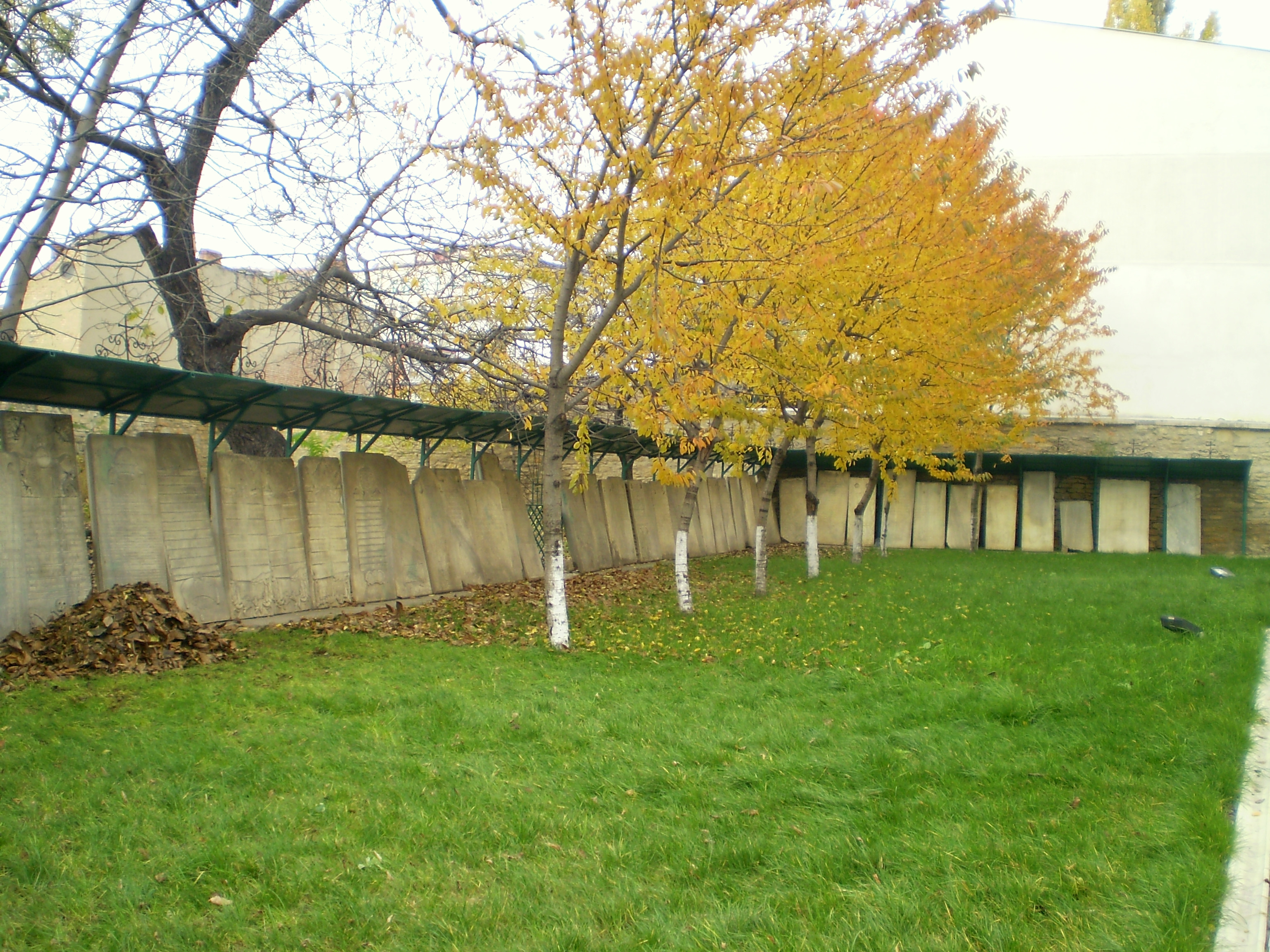
Churchyard headstones

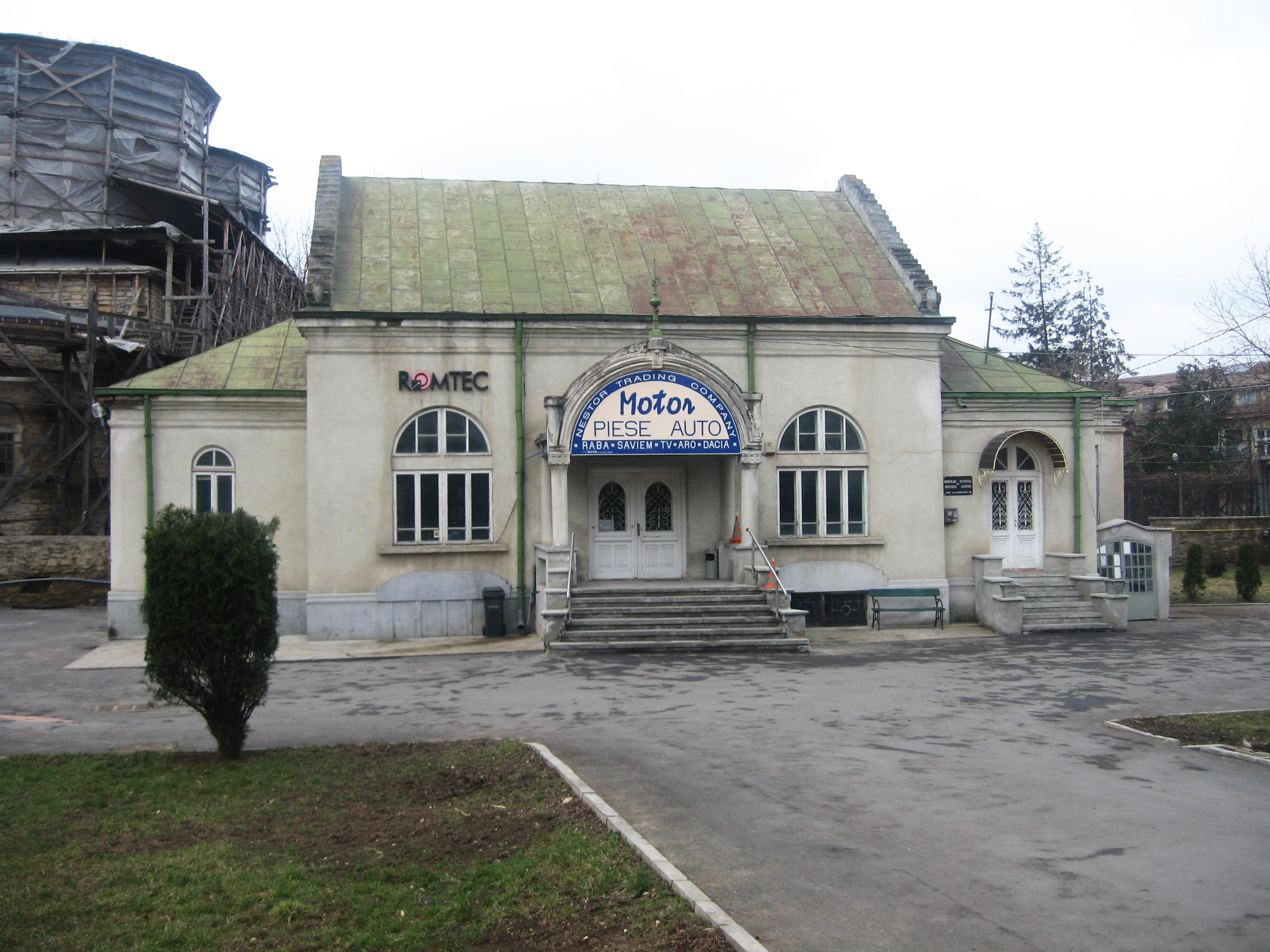
Parish house
