= Broca =

Broca may refer to:

- 340479 Broca, a minor planet
- Broca's area, a region of the hominid brain with functions linked to speech production
- Broca's Brain, a book by Carl Sagan
- Hôpital Broca, a Paris hospital

== People with the surname ==
- Cesar Velasco Broca (born 1978), a Spanish cult filmmaker
- José Brocá (1805–1882), Spanish composer
- Lilian Broca (born 1946), a Romanian-Canadian artist and art educator
- Paul Broca (1824–1880), French physician, anatomist, and anthropologist
- Philippe de Broca (1933–2004), a French movie director
