= Vulpe =

Vulpe (Romanian pronunciation: [ˈvul.pe]) is a Romanian surname meaning "fox". It may refer to:

== People ==
- Alexandru Vulpe (1931-2016), Romanian historian and archaeologist
- Michel Vulpe (born 1952), CEO of i4i
- Nicodim Vulpe (born 1956), a bishop of the Moldovan Orthodox Church

== See also ==
- Vulpe Church, Romanian Orthodox church in Romania
