= Boian, Alberta =

Boian
- Unincorporated community
- Location within Alberta
- Coordinates: 53°49′59″N 112°00′30″W
- Country: Canada
- Province: Alberta
- Region: Central Alberta
- Census Division: 10
- Municipal district: County of Two Hills No. 21
- Founded: 19th century
- Highways: 45; 857

Boian is an unincorporated community in Alberta, Canada. It is located in the floodplain of the North Saskatchewan River, 6 km east of Willingdon, in County of Two Hills No. 21. It is the oldest Romanian settlement in Canada.

== History ==
The community was named for Boian, a Romanian village in Bukovina, from where the settlers originated. The earliest settlers arrived in 1898. In the fall of 1903, the community began building a Romanian Orthodox Church, named by locals after one in their homeland, St Mary Orthodox Church. It was completed in the summer of 1905. By the year 1909, the need for a local school became more immediate, so a small building was constructed in 1910; later a three room school was built from stone which was the largest rural school in Alberta.

The Romanians of Boian did not have enough farmland to further homestead, so many of the first generation went on to form new Romanian communities in Pierceland, Saskatchewan and Manning, Alberta.

Today, the former Boian Mare school is the Boian Community center and has a small museum showcasing Romanian immigration to Alberta, photos of the first Romanian settlers in the area and the typical Romanian farmer's life in rural Canada. As well, the house of the local Yurko family was moved to the Ukrainian Cultural Heritage Village where it portrays the similarities and differences between Ukrainian Canadian and Romanian Canadian culture. In 1982, the Romanian Pioneer Museum of Boian, Alberta was opened. It features a restored pioneer house built in the Bukovinian peasant style, as were about 100 such houses built by Romanian pioneers in the area. This modern museum relates the life of Romanian pioneers from 1898 through to 1935.
