= Vasile Posteucă =

Romanian writer

Vasile Posteucă (10 September 1912, Unterstanestie, Siret district, Austria-Hungary – 6 December 1972, Chicago, Illinois, USA) was a Romanian poet and a member of the Iron Guard.

== In Romania ==
Posteucă was born in Unterstanestie, Bukovina (Romanian: Stăneștii de Jos; now Nyzhni Stanivtsi, Kitsman Raion, Chernivtsi Oblast, Ukraine). He completed his high school studies in Siret (1924–1931), followed by a degree in literature at the University of Cernăuți (1931–1936).

Posteucă began to publish poetry whilst still a university student, making his literary debut in Junimea Literară, a literary magazine based in Cernăuți (now Chernivtsi, Ukraine) and edited by Ion I. Nistor. He also became involved in student politics, participating in the "Aboroasa" student union (serving as its president from 1934 to 1936) and later serving as vice-president of the Student Centre of Cernăuți (Centrul studențesc din Cernăuți), which was organised primarily around ultranationalist politics. He helped to organize the first Congress of Bukovinian Students (Congres al Studențimii Bucovinene, 1936). He was closely involved in organising the fascist Legionary Movement (or Iron Guard) in Bukovina, serving as "commandant" of Hotin County. In the 1937 Romanian general elections, he ran as a candidate for the Iron Guard in Hotin.

During the interwar period he collaborated with a number of far-right, nationalist, and literary publications, amongst them Iconar (directed by Mircea Streinul and Liviu Russu), Însemnări Sociologice (directed by Traian Brăileanu), Buna Vestire (directed by Mihail Manoilescu, later Dragoș Protopopescu and Toma Vlădescu), Falanga, Glasul Bucovinei, Convorbiri literare, and Cuvântul.

Following the Legionnaires' Rebellion in January 1941, Posteucă and other Iron Guard members fled Romania to Germany. He was initially held in a camp in Rostock, later being interned in Buchenwald concentration camp. In 1944 he was recruited by Horia Sima to a propaganda commission as part of the Romanian government-in-exile sponsored by the NSDAP and based in Vienna.

== In exile ==
Posteucă immigrated to Canada, where he completed a Master of Arts in 1953 and his doctoral studies at the University of Toronto in 1962. He continued his associations with other exiled Iron Guard members, meeting with Canadian government officials and co-founding a Romanian Orthodox church in Toronto, and participating in Legionary gatherings in Detroit. He also contributed to a number of Romanian exile journals, including Destin (Madrid, Spain), Luceafărul (Paris, France), Dacia (Brazil), Arc (Montreal, Canada), Libertatea (Madrid), Cuvântul în exil (Freising, West Germany), and Revista Scriitorilor Români (Munich). He co-founded the journal Drum (1963–1972, Mexico) with Nicolae Petra.

In November 1966, he began working as a professor of language arts at Minnesota State University, Mankato.

Posteucă was friends and kept correspondence with Mircea Eliade.

== Later life and death ==
Posteucă spent several years suffering from cancer, during which he was cared for by another former Iron Guardist, Dr. Alexander Ronnett.

Posteucă led a highly publicised campaign to be naturalised as a United States citizen and for his daughter, Doina Vircol, to be allowed by the communist Romanian government to travel from Bucharest to Chicago, in order to meet her before his death. Doina, who had seen her father only once since 1941, succeeded in visiting him in November 1972. Vasile Posteucă died shortly thereafter, on 6 December 1972, at the age of 60. He was buried in Jackson, Michigan.

== Publications ==
- Carte de cântece românești (Madrid: R. Nieto, 1953)
- Poeme fără țară (with N. S. Govora, Nicolae Novac) (Madrid: Editura "Carpații", 1954)
- În marea și'n mormintele din noi (Madrid: Editura Revistei Drum, 1967)
- Poeme din închisori (with Nicolae Novac) (Madrid: Editura Drum, 1970)
- Desgroparea Căpitanului (Madrid: Editura Mișcării Legionare, 1977)
- Icoane de dor. Poeme (Lugoj: Editura "Dacia Europa Noua", 1997)
