= Lisa Patterson =

- Origin: Canada
- Occupations: Singer, songwriter, producer, educator

Lisa Patterson is a Canadian singer, songwriter, producer, and educator.

== Early life and education ==
She was born in Canada to a Scottish father, Rob Patterson, and a Canadian mother of Romanian descent, Elaine Gherasim, who died in 2006.

A classically trained musician, Patterson studied audio engineering and production at Fanshawe College and later attended York University as a performance major focusing on South Indian music, composition, and improvisation.

== Career ==
Patterson has been active as a sideman and solo recording artist touring in North America, India, Mexico, Europe, and the Middle East. While her main instrument is piano, she performs frequently on alto saxophone and duduk. She was active in post-punk and new wave bands in London, Ontario, Canada in the 1980s where she played with Sheep Look Up, Suffer Machine, and Edna and Edna.

In 1999, Patterson founded imaginit music, a Toronto-based company that operates as a recording, rehearsal, and teaching studio. Imaginit music has presented events in Toronto such as Forward Festival at the Lula Lounge and Musiques Sans Frontieres at the Drake Hotel, as well as Patterson's own concerts in South India in association with Alliance Française.

Patterson has commercially released two solo albums and three music videos (through Festival Distribution and Rough Trade Records). She had three Top Ten-charting singles in the Benelux. Her single "Silver Lining", featuring Alex McMaster and recorded by Adam Messinger, was written as a tribute to her mother who died of breast cancer.

With long-time bandmate, cellist and vocalist Alex McMaster, Patterson launched ROAM in 2007, a collaborative duo that takes its name from Patterson’s second album title. ROAM’s debut album Points of Departure (March 2009) was well-received by The Signal, Here and Now, and Metro Morning. They had performed at the Canadian Connections Fair in the Netherlands; the Canadian Music Week Amnesty International showcase 2009; a Toronto Symphony Orchestra soiree; and the Symphony in the Barn Concert Series in Durham, Ontario. ROAM has fluid membership, which has included Rakkatak’s Anita Katakkar (tabla), Oriana Barbato (guitar), and Sarv Ensemble’s Kousha Nikhaie (kamancheh).

Patterson’s songs have appeared in films including Bruce McDonald’s Roadkill, Charles Johnston’s Tête à tête, Darrell Wasyk’s H, and Ingrid Veninger’s Three Sisters On Moon Lake.

As a producer and engineer, Patterson has worked with artists including Rita di Ghent, the Toronto Tabla Ensemble, Emm Gryner., Brenda MacIntyre, and Mélissa Laveaux. She has collaborated with musicians Maryem Tollar, Cassius Khan, Darbuka Siva, Rahul Pophali, Navin Iyer, Venkata Subramanian, and Prakash.

Patterson is an active mentor and coordinator in community arts programs. She has facilitated and presented youth songwriting workshops and performance showcases and was a mentor at the 2009 Ontario Council of Folk Festivals conference in Ottawa and the 2010 Canadian Music Week in Toronto. She has been a company member of Toronto Playback Theatre since 2004, improvising live soundtracks for private and public performances, as well as being coordinator for multiple programs focusing on at-risk youth, cultural diversity, and anti-violence.

Her career initiatives have been supported by the Stephen Lewis Foundation, Amnesty International, Alliance Française, FACTOR Canada, Global Affairs Canada, Canada Council, MuchFACT, BravoFACT, Ontario Arts Council, and Toronto Arts Council.
