= Sheep Look Up =

Canadian band

Sheep Look Up was a Canadian post-punk band, based in London, Ontario. They were active from 1982 until 1988. The band's name derives from the John Brunner novel The Sheep Look Up.

== History ==
Their original line-up consisted of Matt Owen (vocals), Brian Boug (guitar), Greg Moore (drums), Mark Deroux (bass) and John Francom (piano, saxophone). In early 1983 the guitarist was replaced by Gilbert Smith and the vocalist began using the stage name Will Power. From 1983 until 1986 Lisa Patterson was a member and played saxophone and keyboards.

Their first release was the 1983 four-song cassette Entropic Concern. The tracks ("Burning", "Civil Disobedience", "Jumper" and "Wordless One") received airplay on college radio stations. The original tape featured Brian Boug but was later dubbed to reflect Gilbert Smith's different sound. They were also featured on the seminal alternative compilation Domestic Animals, released by Peter Moore. It was compiled from his huge collection of Live Binaural of the local music scene and a variety of other recordings made from 1979 to 1983.

In 1984 they were included on the equally seminal Animals Fight Back (A Christape), a compilation also made from a variety of recordings between 1977 - 1983. In 1986 "Like A Rat" was included on the vinyl LP London Underground, a compilation released by CHRW-FM.

In 1986 the vinyl EP Sheep Look Up was released. The record consisted of four songs: "Rapture", "Falasha", "Big Heart" and "Spaghetti Western", and got a good deal of local airplay. The Milan, Italy and Bath, England. The band toured "Across the left half of Canada" in the spring and fall of 87 to promote the EP.

The band spent the spring and fall of 1988 doing a variety of showcases for major labels and a number of North American, Canadian and European subsidiaries. In 1988 a rough mix of their soon to come full-length LP circulated as a demo tape. It featured four songs recorded and produced with Chris Wardman; "No Good Men", "Propaganda Train", "Girl Song A" and "Final Days". A final version of the LP was never released due to lack of funds and eventual dissolution of the band.

Three videos were made. "Like a Rat" was from a Halloween performance at the Forest City Gallery in London Ontario, "Iskra" was an experimental video shot during a live performance at the Rivoli in Toronto, Ontario and "Spaghetti Western" was made from a variety of found footage, live performance and candid videography compiled while on tour in 86/87. All three videos aired on Much Music.

Over the course of their career they opened for a number of big acts, including The Fall, The Stranglers, Marianne Faithful, Gene Loves Gezebel, Shriekback, and numerous others. They also did a short US tour supporting John Cale in the winter of 86 and supported Love and Rockets across Canada in the spring of '87.
