= Saint Sabbas Church, Iași =

Heritage site in Iași County, Romania

Coordinates: 47.1617°N 27.5886°E

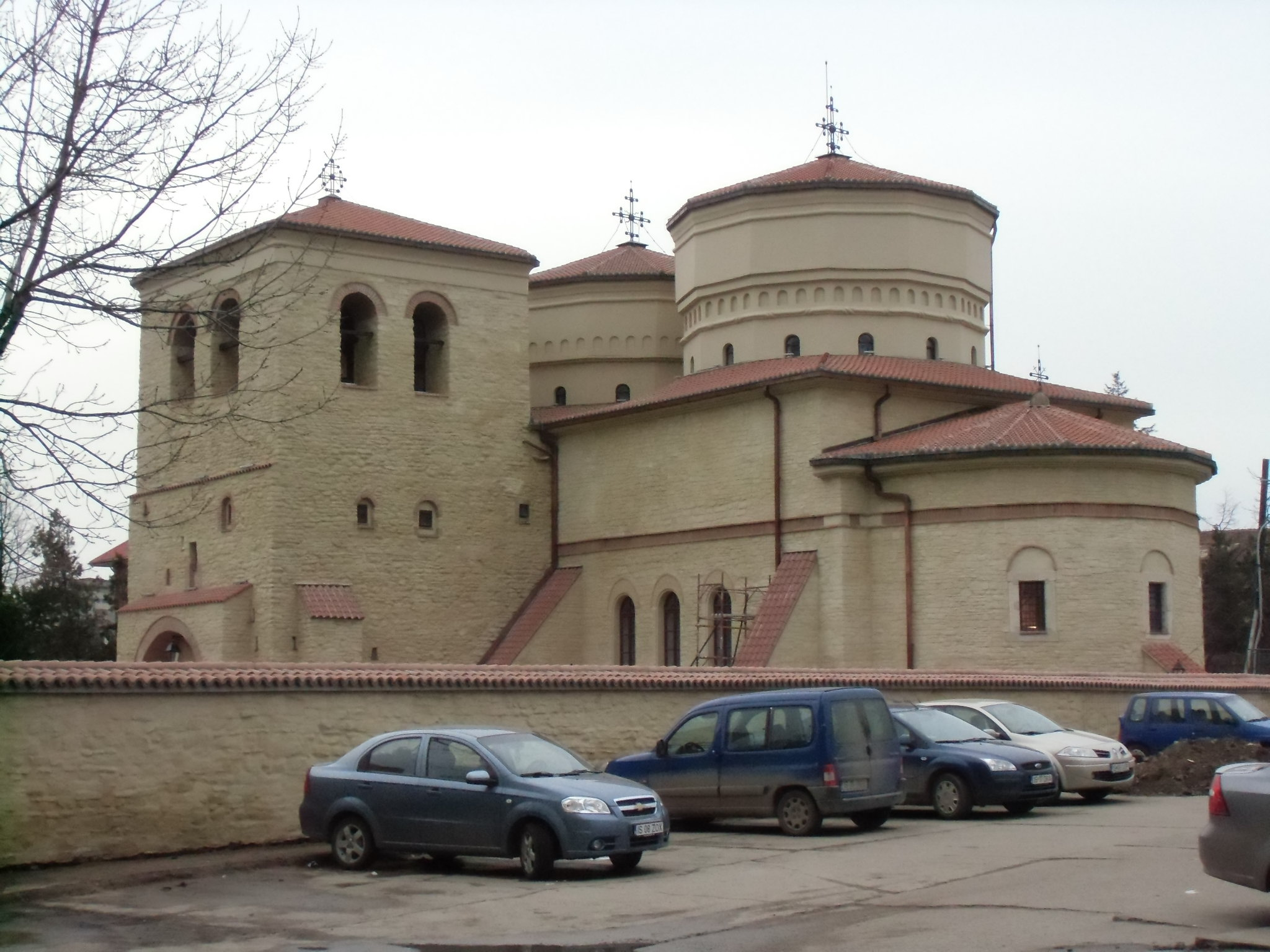
Saint Sabbas Church

Saint Sabbas Church (Romanian: Biserica Sfântul Sava) is a Romanian Orthodox church located at 44 Costache Negri Street in Iași, Romania. It is dedicated to Saint Sabbas the Sanctified.

== Origins and rebuilding ==
The first church on the site was built soon after 1583, when Greek monks from Mar Saba asked Prince Peter the Lame for a plot of land where they could raise a church. Once their request was granted, the monks built a church dedicated to the Dormition of the Mother of God, along with cells, thus forming a monastery. Placed under the protection of Mar Saba, it acquired the Jerusalem monastery's name. It is believed that Peter contributed to building the church, given his appearance in a votive portrait and in prayers of commemoration. The clearest reference to the church comes in a letter written by Michael the Brave in June 1600. Due to the monastery's wealth, the administration of Moldavian properties belonging to the Church of the Holy Sepulchre was located there until the 1863 secularization of monastic estates in Romania.

Problems with the land on which it was built caused the first church to deteriorate rapidly, a process accelerated by the Tatar invasion of 1624. Another theory holds that the church burned in early April 1616, along with all but 600 of the city's 20,000 houses, in a fire caused by Ștefan IX Tomșa. Whatever the case, an entirely new church was built in 1625. Its ktitor was postelnic Enache Caragea, of Greek origin and related to the regnant prince, Radu Mihnea. He donated nearly twenty villages or parts of villages to the monastery, making it among Moldavia's wealthiest. Caragea died in 1632 and was given a lavish headstone inside the church, which does not survive. The bell tower was added at a later, undetermined date. There are three dedication plaques, one in Old Church Slavonic and two in Greek. The first surviving description is from Paul of Aleppo later in the 17th century.

== 17th and 18th centuries ==
In 1676-1678, Prince Antonie Ruset, a distant relative of Caragea's, rebuilt the surrounding wall, of which the eastern part still survives. Archaeological excavations carried out in 1976-1979 found that the original church was quite similar to the second one, that the newer one was built further to the north and that both were used as burial grounds including over 300 graves. Research also determined that the area was used for ceramic production from the 15th century until shortly after 1500, when a powerful fire destroyed the workshop. Caragea died without descendants, and by the mid-17th century, the monastery was in the hands of the noble Palade family, with several of its members being buried on the site through the 19th century. Three of their graves are in the vestibule; a fourth has an illegible inscription, but may belong to the architect Ianachi. It was the Palades who removed Caragea's grave, just as he had removed the graves of the 1583 founders. When the Peloponnesian archimandrite Grigore repaired the church in 1820, he left a plaque portraying himself as the sole ktitor. Such historical amnesia had the approval of the church, which benefited from substantial contributions in exchange for allowing donors to claim the status of founders.

Due to its importance, the monastery hosted various foreign visitors. These included Jerusalem Patriarchs Theophanes III (1617 and 1618), Nectarius (1664) and Dositheos II (1670 and 1673), as well as Antioch Patriarch Macarios III Zaim (1653). In 1619, Neofit of Rhodes translated the Life of Saint Sabbas into vernacular Greek; his book was donated to the monastery. In 1714, during the reign of Nicholas Mavrocordatos and upon the advice of Chrysanthus of Jerusalem, the Princely Academy of Iași opened on the site. A Slavonic and Romanian printing press as well as a library were also opened; in 1744, Sylvester of Antioch arranged for printing in Greek and Arabic as well. After secularization, the library, which included over 800 volumes, was given to the recently established university library. Tradition holds that galleries existed beneath the church and were used in cases of need to hide locals' property and the monastery's valuables, and could even be used to hold liturgies. Large feasts were held for Saint Sabbas' day (December 5), both in people's houses and outside. Moreover, the Greek monks distributed gifts of objects and money every month to the poor and the sick.

== Later history and collections ==
After 1863, the monastery scaled back its cultural activities, although a school opened in the archimandrite's residence the following year. By 1877, this had become a girls' school, housed in a new building. The monastery was converted into a parish church after clergy reform in 1893. The parish closed in 1951 but reopened in 1958.

The church features a two-room museum that includes 80 books from the 18th and 19th centuries and valuable religious objects such as a Polish-inscribed bell from 1570, an aër from 1842 with Greek writing, an 18th-century wool curtain sewn in Byzantine style, 19th-century vestments, icons and liturgical items. There is a large Slavonic Gospel book printed at Moscow in 1637 and coated in silver and gold at Iași in 1642. Coins, ceramics and jewelry unearthed in the 1970s are also kept there. A large icon of Saint John Chrysostom in the nave is from 1711. The Renaissance interior painting done in fresco-secco in 1832, largely destroyed over time, was reworked in neo-Byzantine style from 2010 to 2013. The 19th-century iconostasis, featuring rich Baroque carvings, was restored in the same period. After Dancu Monastery was demolished in 1903, the relics of Saint Tryphon and Saint Marina were transferred to the church.

The church is listed as a historic monument by Romania's Ministry of Culture and Religious Affairs, as are the nearby ruins and the protective wall.

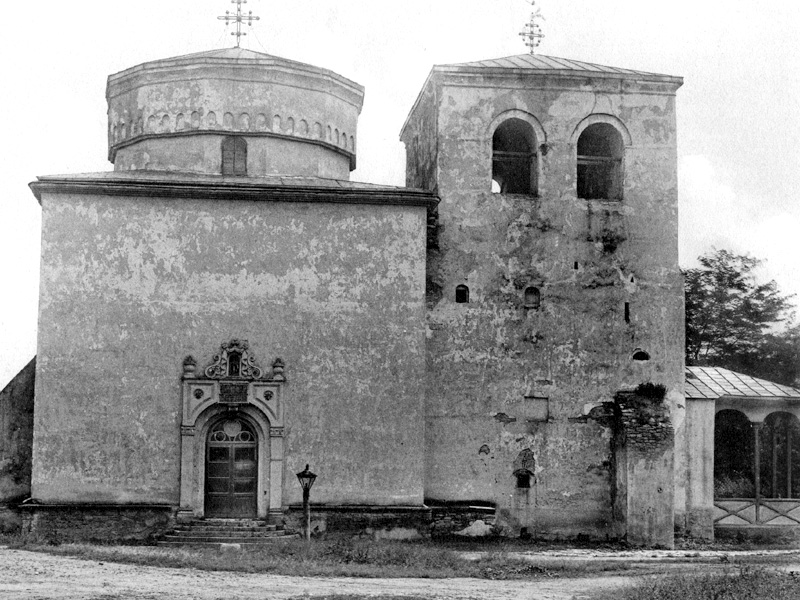
Early 20th century

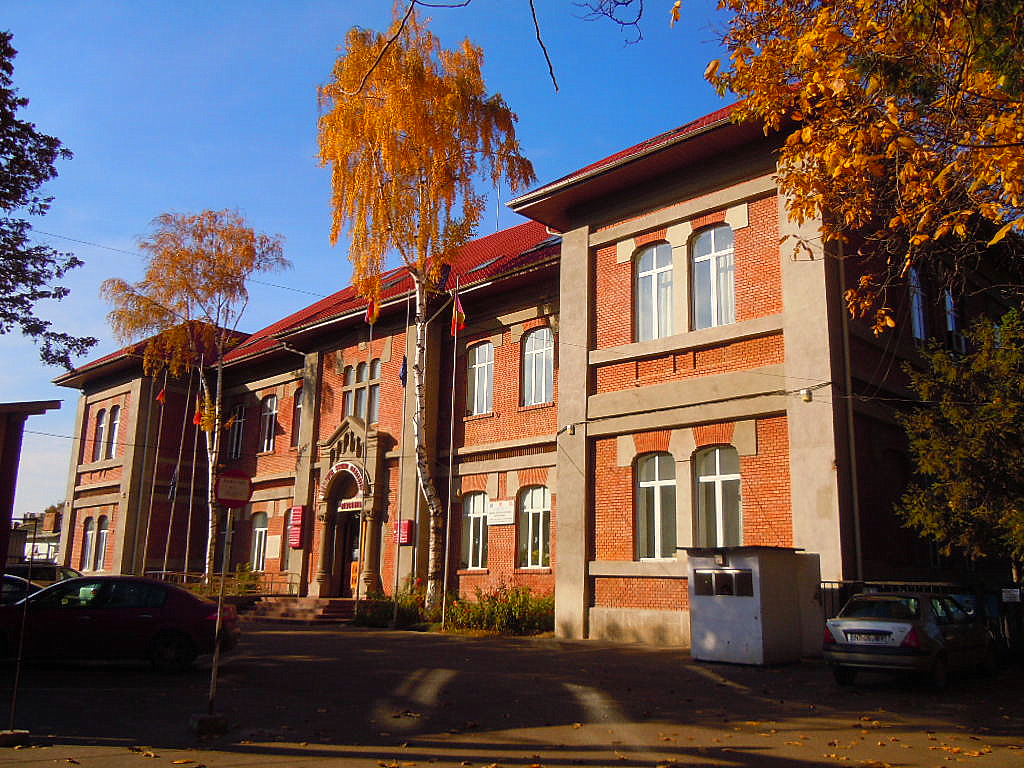
Former girls' school, now a charitable institute

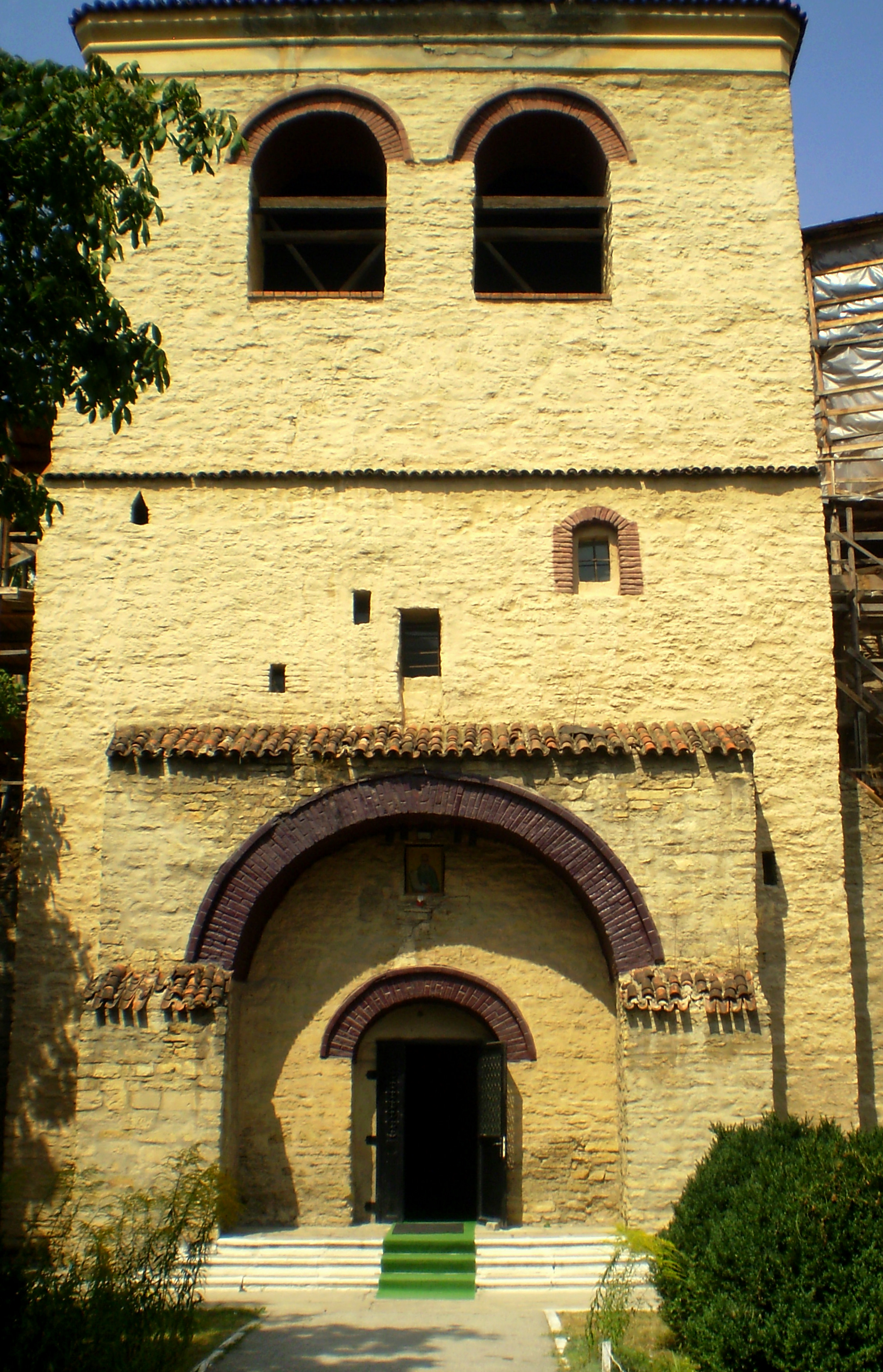
Entrance

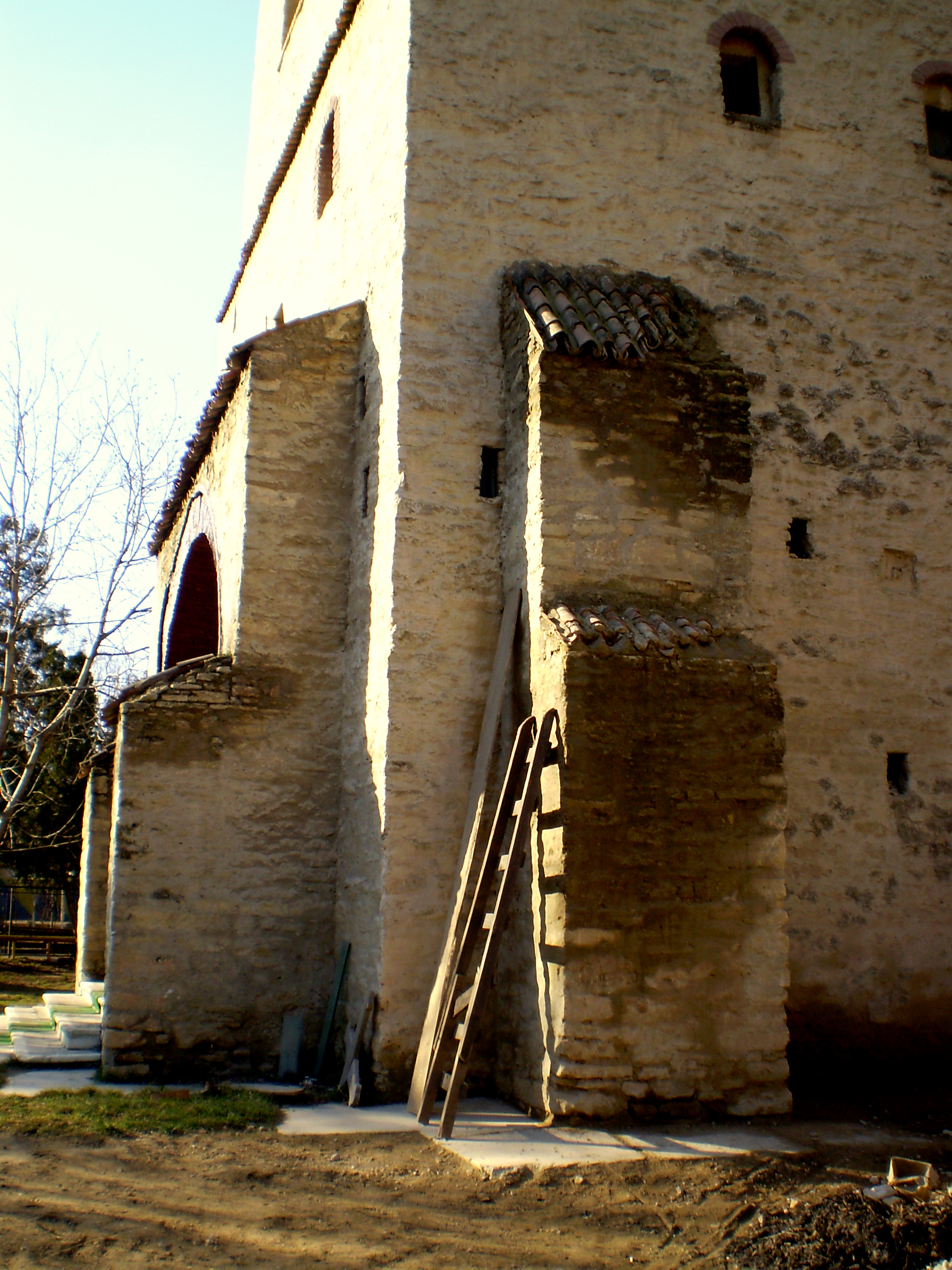
Detail
