= Vulpescu =

Vulpescu is a Romanian surname. It is a patronymic surname derived from the given name/nickname Vulpe, meaning "fox". Notable people with the surname include:

- Ioan Vulpescu (born 1976), Romanian politician
- Sofronie Vulpescu (1856–1923), Romanian cleric
