= Lilian Broca =

Romanian-Canadian artist and art educator

- Born: June 15, 1946 (age 80); Bucharest, Romania
- Education: Pratt Institute, New York City; Concordia University, Montreal
- Known for: Byzantine Glass Mosaicist, Painter, Graphic artist
- Notable work: Queen Esther Series, The Judith Series
- Movement: Contemporary Baroque, Feminist Art
- Awards: Lorenzo il Magnifico (2003)
- Website: www.lilianbroca.com

Lilian Broca (born June 15, 1946) is a Canadian artist and art educator based in Vancouver, British Columbia.

== Early life and education ==
Broca was born in Bucharest. The Broca family immigrated to Montreal, Canada in 1962. There, she attended and graduated from Northmount High School in 1964. She began drawing and painting at an early age and won several artistic awards before she enrolled in the BFA programme at Sir George Williams University (now Concordia University). Broca graduated with honours in 1968. She became a Canadian citizen in 1967. In 1969, Broca received a Bourse de Perfectionnement from the Quebec Government to study abroad. She enrolled in the Graduate Fine Arts programme at Pratt Institute in New York City, graduating with an MFA (honours) in 1971. That year she married David Goodman in Montreal and together they relocated to Vancouver BC.

== Career ==
=== Teaching ===
Broca taught at Douglas College (later named Kwantlen College and presently Kwantlen Polytechnic University) for 15 years as well as being a guest lecturer at the University of British Columbia, Simon Fraser University and the Okanagan School of the Arts.

In 2000 Broca collaborated with Canadian author/poet Joy Kogawa on the book A Song of Lilith, based on the legend of Lilith, an ancient Hebrew mythological figure. Kogawa's text and Broca's images were incorporated into a concert/performance directed by Kristine Bogyo with classical composer Larysa Kuzmenko, writer Joy Kogawa, actor Moira Wylie, and five classical music performers. The premiere of the concert opened in Toronto at the St. Lawrence Centre for The Arts in Sept. 2000; the following year it was performed in various cities across Canada.

In 2015 Broca was appointed as a Jack and Doris Shadbolt Community Scholar, a subset of the Shadbolt Fellow in Graduate Liberal Studies at Simon Fraser University. In 2017 Broca was appointed as a member of the Advisory Board for Mosaic Research Center at Uludağ University, Bursa, Turkey.

=== Documentary ===
Broca was the subject of the documentary film Return to Byzantium: The Art and Life of Lilian Broca, which premiered in Canada at The National Library and Archives in Ottawa in 2012. Director and producer Adelina Suvagau led the Canadian/Romanian co-production which spanned over a five-year period. The documentary was selected for participation in five International Film Festivals in the US and in Canada, including the San Pedro International Film Festival, where it won the Best Documentary Award in 2012. The film was acquired by CBC (Canadian Broadcasting Corporation) television network and first aired on July 20, 2013.

=== Artistic practice ===
Broca's early works were representational. In the 1970s Broca experimented with various abstract styles, held exhibitions in Vancouver and received several commissions from the city of Vancouver and Kwantlen College for large painted murals.

At the beginning of the 1980s she began a more realistic phase. Although at a time representational art was not in vogue, Broca persisted and her works, which dealt with human relationships, were exhibited across Canada, including in Regina.

In the 1990s Broca's work showed more emphasis on social issues, particularly women's issues. The Vancouver Art Gallery purchased Broca's work and the-then director Brooks Joyner commented: Lilian Broca is an accomplished artist, a superb draughtsman, who knows about art history. ...a committed artist producing a significant body of work....She is discovering things in our present and past that are keys to understanding heroics in life. At the end of that decade, a solo exhibition was held at the Frye Art Museum in Seattle, Washington.

In 2002 Broca changed her medium from paint and canvas to glass mosaics. She began to create large scale mosaics using historical iconography and materials such as Byzantine smalti, gold smalti and millefiori on honeycomb aluminum panels. She took inspiration from the courageous acts of biblical women. A book about her work, The Hidden and the Revealed: The Esther Mosaics of Lilian Broca, by Sheila D. Campbell, Yosef Wosk, Gareth Sirotnik and Broca was published in 2011. The book describes how her art gives "voice, form and personality" to these women and their stories.

== Exhibitions ==
=== Solo exhibitions ===
- Lilian Broca: Mirrors and Reflections (2001). Retrospective.
- The Hidden and The Revealed (2006). JD Carrier Art Gallery, Toronto, ON
- Heroine of a Thousand Pieces: The Judith Mosaics of Lilian Broca (2015). Il Museo, Vancouver, BC
- The Judith Mosaic Series (2016) JD Carrier Art Gallery], Toronto, ON
- Judith and Esther, Two Critical Post Modern Heroines, Heroine of a Thousand Pieces: The Judith Mosaics of Lilian Broca Museum of Biblical Art, Dallas, TX (2017)

=== Notable group exhibitions ===
- Florence Biennale International Exhibition (2003). Florence, Italy
- Opus Veritas: Fragments of Truth (2004). American Italian Museum, San Francisco, CA
- International Mosaic Exhibition AIMC (2010). M Theocharakis Foundation for the
- International Contemporary Mosaic Art Convergence – Top Artists from Around the World Exhibit (2012). Clauiano, Italy
- Gaziantep International Contemporary Mosaic Exhibition (2013) Zeugma Museum, Gaziantep, Turkey
- Characters in a Book (2016). Lexington Public Library Fine Arts Gallery, Lexington, KY, Fine Arts Athens, Greece, and at the Smith Museum of Stained Glass Windows, Chicago, IL.
- Mosaic Arts International 2016 (2016). Women's Museum of California], San Diego, CA
- Mosaic Arts International 2017 (2017). Janice Charach Gallery, West Bloomfield, MI

== Books ==
- 2001 A Song of Lilith, text by Joy Kogawa, Artworks by Lilian Broca.
- 2003 Lilith avatars et métamorphoses d'un mythe entre romantisme et et décadence by Pascale Auraix-Jonchiere Broca's works were analyzed with printed images.
- 2008 Feminist Theology with a Canadian Accent by Mary Ann Beavis, Broca was highlighted in the chapter The Influence of Feminist Theology on Canadian Women Artists by Mary Ann Beavis.
- In 2010 the book Tiffany Studios' Techniques Inspiration for Today's Artists, by Edith Crouch was published. Broca was featured on 21 pages. The same year Broca was one of five featured artists in the book Mosaic Fine Art: Portraits by Pam Givens and Irit Levy.
- In 2011 the hardcover book, The Hidden and The Revealed: The Queen Esther Mosaics of Lilian Broca by Sheila Campbell, Yosef Wosk and Lilian Broca, was launched in Canada and the US. The book contained a preface by feminist artist Judy Chicago.
- 2015 Il Museo at the Italian Cultural Centre, Vancouver, Canada, published the book/catalogue Heroine of a Thousand Pieces: The Judith Mosaics of Lilian Broca, by Yosef Wosk, Sheila Campbell, Angela Clarke, Adolfo Roitman and Lilian Broca. The same year the book The Bible Retold by Jewish Artists, Writers, Composers & Filmmakers, edited by Helen Leneman and Barry Dov Walfish, included a chapter on Queen Esther and Lilian Broca's mosaics.

== Selected awards ==
Broca received First Place awards for her mosaic artworks in International exhibitions at the Italian-American Museum SF, 2004, and in Chicago, 2006; as well, Broca received the Juror's Choice award at Women's Museum of California, San Diego in 2016.

In 2003 Broca received the Lorenzo il Magnifico (Medici) gold medal in the 2003 Florence Biennale International Exhibition, Florence, Italy.

The Bourse de Perfectionnement was awarded to Broca to study abroad in 1968 and in 1969, by the Provincial Government of Quebec.
