= Adolfo Roitman =

Dead Sea Scrolls scholar

- Born: June 13, 1957 (age 69); Buenos Aires, Argentina
- Occupations: Archaeologist, religious scientist and rabbi

Adolfo Daniel Roitman (born June 13, 1957) is an Argentine-born Israeli archaeologist and expert in comparative religions. Since 1994, he has been the curator of the Dead Sea Scrolls collection and the director of the Shrine of the Book at the Israel Museum, where he promoted the platform that displays the scrolls online for the world.

== Biography ==
Roitman was born on June 13, 1957, in Buenos Aires, Argentina. The son of Susana and Manuel Roitman, a native of San Juan from the town of General San Martín, Roitman was born and raised in the Jewish community of the Buenos Aires neighborhood of La Paternal, and studied at the University of Buenos Aires. In 1986, he graduated as a rabbi from the Latin American Rabbinical Seminary and later emigrated to Israel, already speaking Hebrew, with his doctoral thesis based on the Book of Judith.

With this background, he obtained the position of curator of the Dead Sea Scrolls, dealing with leather as his grandfather had done, who was a shoemaker in the city of San Juan, where Adolfo Roitman was named an illustrious visitor in 2017. He was married, has three children, lives in Israel, and speaks and writes in Spanish, English, and Hebrew.

In 2019, the documentary Paternal, directed by Eduardo Yedlin, was released in Argentina. It chronicles Adolfo Roitman's journey from the Buenos Aires neighborhood to guarding the Dead Sea Scrolls.

== Career ==
In 1980, he obtained a cum laude bachelor's degree in anthropology and a teaching degree in history from the University of Buenos Aires. He continued his master's studies, graduating in 1985 with cum laude honors in Comparative Religion from the Hebrew University of Jerusalem, where he also earned a doctorate in Ancient Jewish Thought. He was a professor of Comparative Religion at the Hebrew University of Jerusalem and of Ancient Jewish Thought at the Schechter Institute of Jewish Studies. Through one of the judges on his doctoral committee, he learned of the opening and applied for the position of curator and director of the Shrine of the Book, where he has served since 1994 as the Lizbeth and George Krupp Curator of the Dead Sea Scrolls and Director of the Shrine of the Book at the Israel Museum.

As curator, Roitman took care of the physical health of the manuscripts in his charge, and also researched, published, and disseminated their content through publications, exhibitions, or educational projects, developing new strategies, such as producing the dramatic film about the Dead Sea community called The Human Sanctuary or an animated film about the scrolls for children. The Human Sanctuary is available online and, although it is not a documentary, it shows information on the screen about the place and time in which the community that kept the Dead Sea Scrolls lived. His goal was to find different languages for different types of audiences, developing training programs for high school students, or curating exhibitions, such as the one aimed at disseminating the nano Bible, the smallest Bible in the world.

Among all these new strategies, the digitization of the scrolls and their availability via Google since September 2011 stands out, making it possible for everyone, not just researchers, to read the scrolls. Roitman wrote the texts that accompany the scrolls on the Internet, including information about their discovery in the caves of Qumran, and photographer Ardon Bar Hama took the images, while Google's engineers developed the platform where they would be hosted, and a team from the Israel Museum worked to integrate that development into their website.

He has participated in international conferences and symposia, and has also been a visiting professor at academic institutions such as the University of Buenos Aires, the Hebrew University of Jerusalem, New York University, the Complutense University of Madrid, El Colegio de México, Anahuac University, Hebraica University in Mexico, the Presbyterian Mackenzie University in São Paulo, and the Pontifical Catholic University of Chile in Santiago de Chile. He is also the author of various articles in professional journals, as well as popular essays.

== Works ==
Among his published books, A Day At Qumran: The Dead Sea Sect and Its Scrolls, published by The Israel Museum, Jerusalem (1998), stands out. The first book published in Spain was Sectarians of Qumran: Daily Life of the Essenes, published in 2000 by Ediciones Martínez Roca.

He co-edited Envisioning the Temple: Scrolls, Stones, and Symbols (2003 Roitman, Laderman), The Bible in Shrine of the Book From the Dead Sea Scrolls to the Aleppo Codex published in 2006, and The Dead Sea Scrolls and Contemporary Culture, edited by Adolfo D. Roitman, Lawrence H. Schiffman, and Shani Tzoref and published by Brill in 2011.

In The Bible, Exegesis, and Religion, published by Verbo Divino, he proposed a critical historical reading of Judaism, changing the start date of monotheism to an earlier date than previously established, placing it closer to the 8th and 6th centuries BCE, according to the current scholarly consensus about the long gestation that the image of a single God had.

In 2016, the Verbo Divino publishing house released From the Tabernacle to the Temple. On Sacred Space in Ancient Judaism.

== Awards and honors ==
His recognitions include being named Doctor Honoris Causa by Rocky Mountain College in the United States in 2005 and receiving the Gold Medal from the Faculty of Humanities at Anahuac University in Mexico City in 2014.

In 2017, he received his second Doctor Honoris Causa title from the Catholic University of Cuyo, San Juan, Argentina.
