= Nyzhni Stanivtsi =

Ukrainian village

Coordinates: 48°18′11″N 25°33′12″E

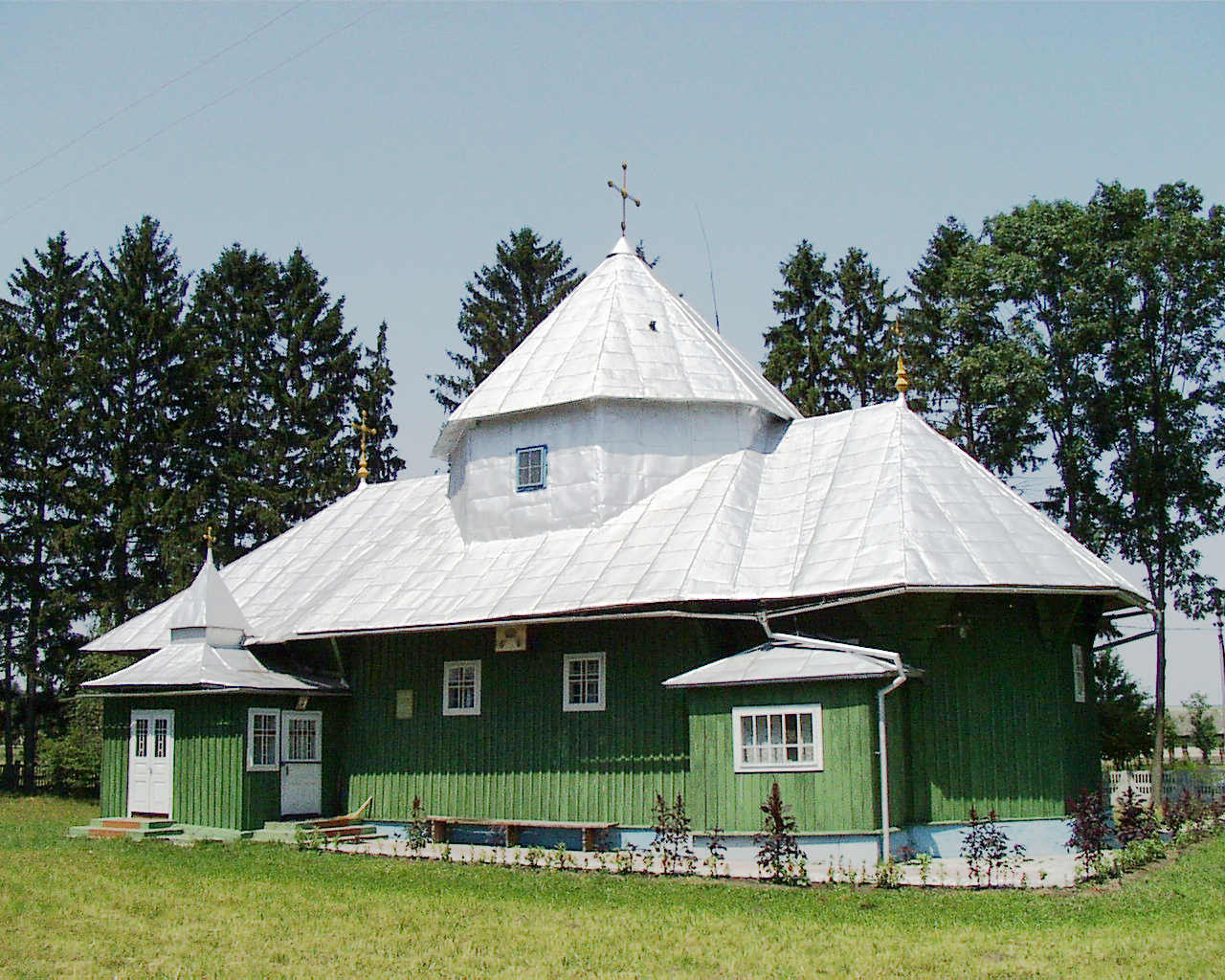
St. Nicholas Church

Nyzhni Stanivtsi (Ukrainian: Нижні Станівці, previously Stanivtsi Dolishni; Romanian: Stăneștii de Jos or Stăneştii-de-Jos-pe-Ceremuş; German: Unter-Stanestie or Unterstanescht) is a village in Vyzhnytsia Raion, Chernivtsi Oblast, Ukraine. Located on the Brusnytsia River, the right tributary of the Prut, it is 12 miles northwest of Storozhynets and 13 miles southwest of Kitsman.

Before it was abolished as part of the 2020 administrative reform, the silrada included the villages of Vyviz, Brusenky, and Vynohrad.

The town has been part of the historical region of Bukovina since its establishment. The first documentary attestation of the village took place in 1596.

The surviving remnants of the Jewish cemetery in Nyzhni Stanivtsi has tombstones dated as early as 1882. Before World War II, a large number of the doctors, lawyers, pharmacists, and merchants in the town were Jewish, even the district judge and the police chief. The Jewish community in the town was almost entirely murdered during the Holocaust.
