= Vulpe Church =

Heritage site in Iași County, Romania

Coordinates: 47°10′10″N 27°35′17″E

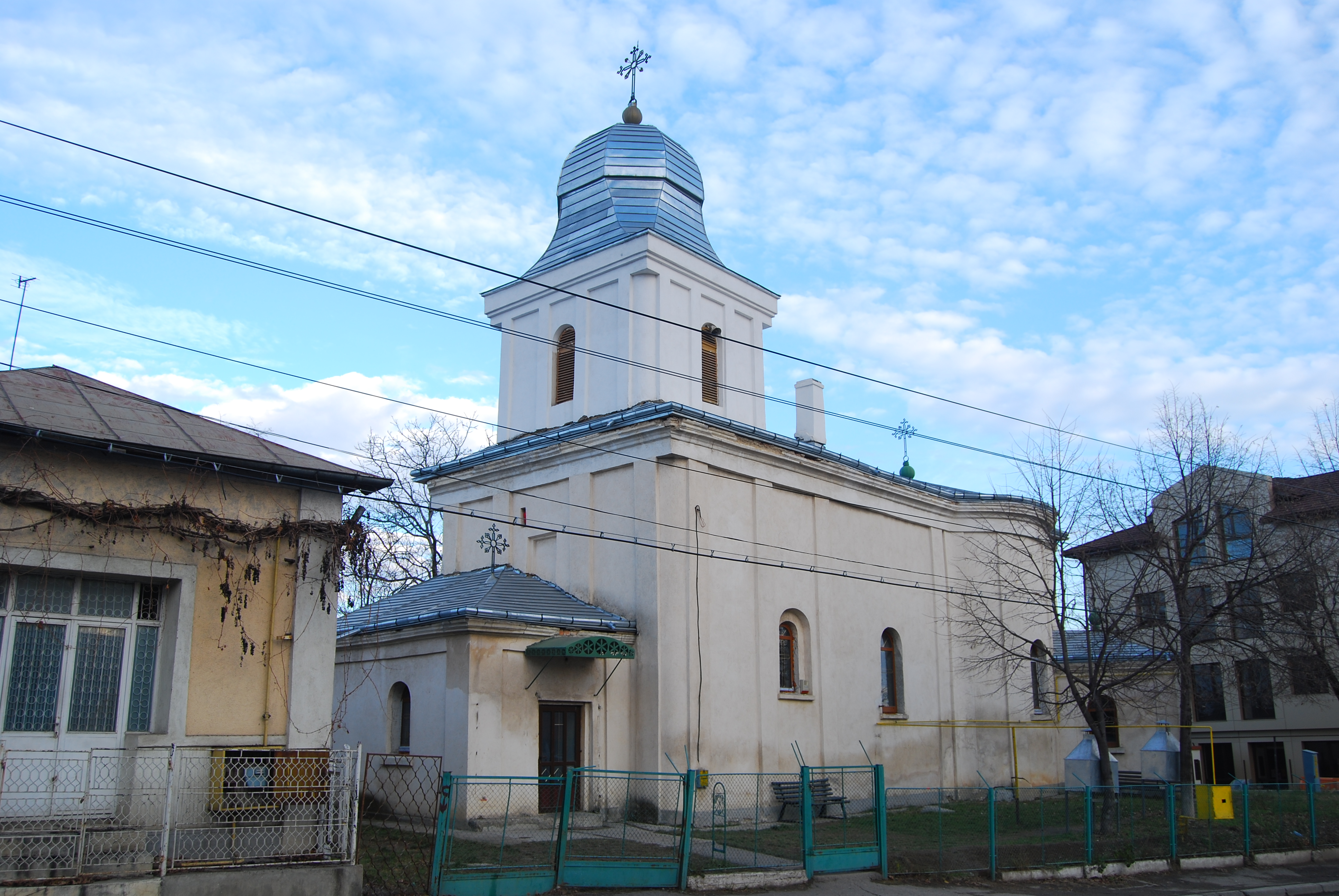
Vulpe Church

The Vulpe Church (Romanian: Biserica Vulpe) is a Romanian Orthodox church located at 40 Sărăriei Street in Iași, Romania. It is dedicated to the Dormition of the Mother of God and to Anthony the Great.

The first church on this site was made of wood. It burned down in summer 1644, was remade in wood, and devastated by the 1738 Vrancea earthquake and another in 1790. After it burned again in July 1844, it was rebuilt in stone later that year, with funds supplied by vornic Teodor Burada. However, other historians claim the church was built around 1760 by the bragă sellers' guild. According to an 1868 inscription on a cross placed on the altar table and donated by Prince Carol I of Romania, the church had also belonged to the blanket-makers' guild.

Three semi-legendary stories surround the foundation of the first church. One holds that it was established by a great boyar named Vulpe. Another says that a hunter pursued a rare fox (vulpe in Romanian) for a long time, promising he would build a church where he killed it, which he did. A third holds that the blanket-makers built the church, naming it after the material they used in their wares. There was formerly a cemetery in the churchyard, and two of its headstones, now gone, were still visible in the early 20th century. One was heart-shaped and mentioned the Union of the Principalities. Another was square, with a torch in each corner, and commemorated a woman who participated in the Moldavian Revolution of 1848.

The church is listed as a historic monument by Romania's Ministry of Culture and Religious Affairs.
