= I4i =

Software company in Canada

i4i
- Native name: Infrastructures for Information
- Company type: independent
- Industry: software
- Founded: 1993; 33 years ago
- Founder: Michel Vulpe
- Headquarters: Toronto, Ontario, Canada

i4i (Infrastructures for Information) is an independent software company specializing in the delivery of XML / SGML document processing software in Toronto, Ontario, Canada, founded by Michel Vulpe in 1993.

== Patent dispute ==
In 1994, Michel Vulpe and Stephen Owens filed for a patent for methods for using regular word processors as XML /SGML editors.

In 1998, the United States Patent and Trademark Office issued patent #5,787,449, which describes the invention as "a system and method for the separate manipulation of the architecture and content of a document, particularly for data representation and transformations. The system, for use by computer software developers, removes dependency on document encoding technology. A map of metacodes found in the document is produced and provided and stored separately from the document. The map indicates the location and addresses of metacodes in the document. The system allows of multiple views of the same content, the ability to work solely on structure and solely on content, storage efficiency of multiple versions and efficiency of operation."

In 2007, Microsoft filed an ex-parte re-examination request with the USPTO citing prior art as invalidating the 5,787,449 patent. The USPTO reviewed the prior art and Microsoft's assertions of patent invalidity in light of the prior art.

In April 2010 the USPTO affirmed all the challenged claims. Microsoft also filed for patent re-examination with the USPTO. The re-examination confirmed all the challenged claims. Not satisfied with this result, Microsoft filed an appeal to the Commissioner of Patents. This was turned down. Microsoft then filed another re-examination request. This second request was denied by the USPTO.

In May 2007, Vulpe and i4i successfully sued Microsoft, in the United States District Court for the Eastern District of Texas, for willfully infringing the '449 patent. The court awarded over $240 million in damages and granted the first ever injunction against the infringing product, Microsoft Word. The injunction was stayed by the US Court of Appeals for the Federal Circuit pending Microsoft's appeal. On December 22, 2009 the Court affirmed in full the decision of the lower court: the injunction was reinstated, the damages awarded affirmed and the validity of the patent affirmed.

Microsoft subsequently filed a petition for a writ of certiorari with the United States Supreme Court asking it to hear the case. The question put to the Court was: "The Patent Act provides that '[a] patent shall be presumed valid' and that '[t]he burden of establishing invalidity of a patent or any claim thereof shall rest on the party asserting such invalidity.' 35 U.S.C. § 282. The Federal Circuit held below that Microsoft was required to prove its defense of invalidity under 35 U.S.C. § 102(b) by 'clear and convincing evidence,' even though the prior art on which the invalidity defense rests was not considered by the Patent and Trademark Office prior to the issuance of the asserted patent. The question presented is: Whether the court of appeals erred in holding that Microsoft's invalidity defense must be proved by clear and convincing evidence."

The writ was granted in November 2010 for the case Microsoft Corp. v. i4i Ltd. Partnership. On June 9, 2011, the US Supreme Court ruled in favour of i4i in a unanimous decision. Microsoft was ordered to pay $300 million in damages to i4i.
