= Barraud =

Barraud is a surname. Notable people with the surname include:

- Aimé Barraud (1902–1954), Swiss painter
- Ali Barraud (1918–2015), Burkinabé politician
- Charles Decimus Barraud (1822–1897), English-born New Zealand artist
- Cyril Henry Barraud (1877–1965), English artist
- Enid Barraud (1904-1972), English writer
- Francis Barraud (1856–1924), English painter
- Francis Philip Barraud, (1824–1900), English designer working in stained glass
- François Barraud (1899–1934), Swiss painter
- George Barraud (1889–1970), British film actor
- Henry Barraud (composer) (1900–1997), French composer
- Henry Barraud (artist) (1811–1874), English portrait, subject and animal painter
- Herbert Rose Barraud (1845-c.1896), English portrait photographer
- Ned Barraud (born 1976), New Zealand illustrator and writer
- Philip James Barraud (1879–1948), English entomologist
- Sarah Maria Barraud (1823–1895), English-born New Zealand letter-writer
- William Barraud (1810–1850), English animal painter and illustrator
