= His Master's Voice (British record label) =

British record label active 1909–1993

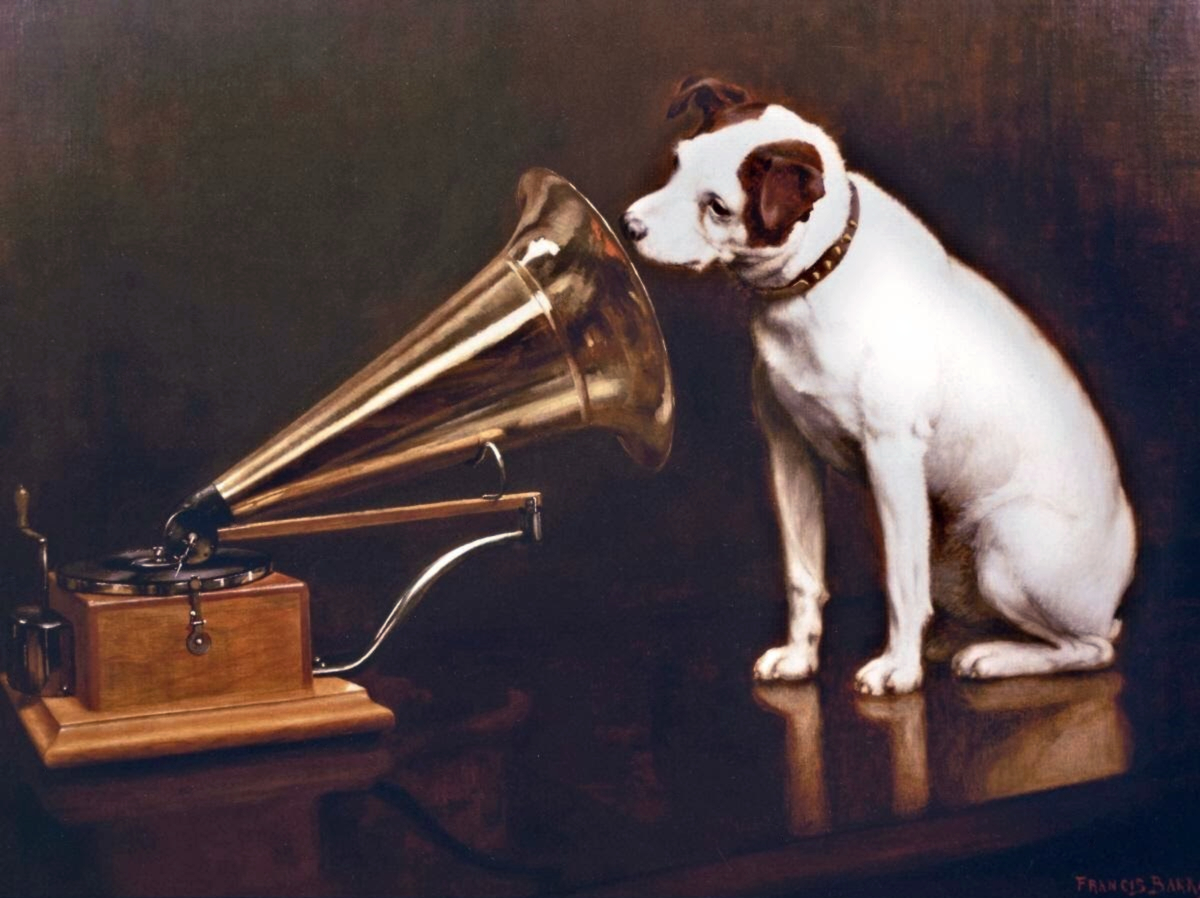
- Parent company: Gramophone Company (1909–1973); EMI (1973–1979); Thorn EMI (1979–1993)
- Founded: 1909; 117 years ago
- Defunct: 1993; 33 years ago
- Status: Replaced by EMI Classics
- Country of origin: United Kingdom

His Master's Voice was the unofficial name of a British record label established in 1909. Whilst mainly releasing in the United Kingdom, the label also released in various European, African and other territories. Sister labels were also created, such as Saregama, that lasted until 2003.

"His Master's Voice" was a trademark of the Gramophone Company Limited (later part of EMI). In 1909, the Gramophone Company replaced the "Recording Angel" trademark with the image of Nipper the dog, listening to "His Master's Voice" on their record labels; thereafter, the records were commonly referred to as "His Master's Voice" (or HMV) records, due to the prominence of that phrase along the upper rim of the labels. In 1973, HMV became a sub-label of EMI Records as a result of a corporate restructuring.

From 1990, the His Master's Voice label began being phased out in favour for the newly-established EMI Classics label. The final British His Master's Voice release was Morrissey's live album, Beethoven Was Deaf, in May 1993.

In 2003, EMI sold the "His Master's Voice" intellectual property to HMV, its former retail division, which it had divested in 1998.

== History ==
His Master's Voice was founded as a classical label. From December 1899, the predecessor to EMI, the Gramophone Company, had purchased the His Master's Voice painting from Francis Barraud, and, from 1909, began using the phrase "His Master's Voice" and likeness of Nipper on its releases. In 1921, the Gramophone Company established His Master's Voice as a music retail chain. In 1931, the Gramophone Company merged with Columbia Graphophone Company to form EMI, with Gramophone Company continuing as a label, and His Master's Voice continuing as a sub-label, under EMI.

In 1952, the label entered the pop music genre, and used a POP number prefix. It also signed American talent such as Elvis Presley for British distribution. This continued until 1967, when its domestic pop artists moved to either Columbia Graphophone or Parlophone, and American performers were moved to Stateside Records, reserving His Master's Voice for classical recordings.

In July 1973, the Gramophone Company became EMI Records, with His Master's Voice continuing as a sub-label. From 1990, His Master's Voice began to be phased out as a record label, and gradually replaced for EMI Classics. The final His Master's Voice release was Morrissey's Beethoven Was Deaf, a live album released in May 1993.

In 1998, EMI spun off its HMV retail business, becoming its own entity, and in 2003, divested the "His Master's Voice" intellectual property to the retail business.
