= Francis Barraud =

English painter (1856–1924)

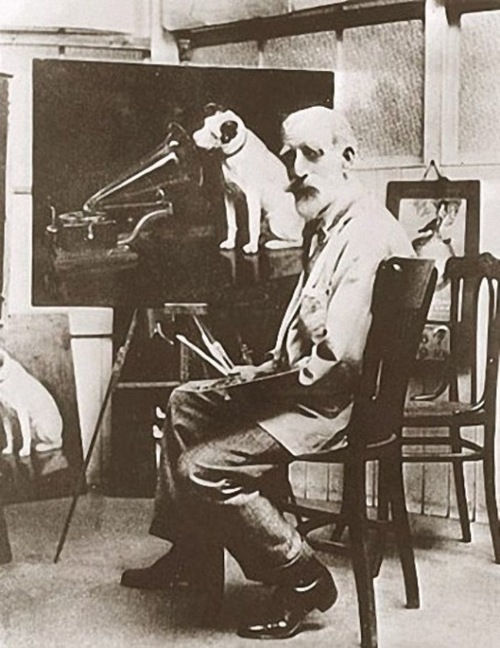
- 1922 photograph of Barraud with one of many copies of His Master's Voice
- Born: Francis James Barraud; 16 June 1856; Marylebone, London, England
- Died: 29 August 1924 (aged 68); Hampstead, London, England
- Known for: Painter
- Notable work: His Master's Voice
- Father: Henry Barraud

Francis James Barraud (16 June 1856 – 29 August 1924) was an English painter. He is best known for his painting His Master's Voice, one of the most famous commercial logos in the world, having been adopted as a recording industry trademark used by various corporations including RCA Victor, EMI, HMV, JVC and Deutsche Grammophon. The image, which depicts an actual dog named Nipper, ear cocked as he listens to a wind-up disc gramophone helped popularize the nascent field of sound recording and brought Barraud worldwide notoriety. He spent the rest of his career earning a comfortable living by producing dozens of copies of the painting for record company executives and employees.

== Early life ==
Barraud was born in Marylebone, London, on 16 June 1856 into a family of artists and creatives. Both his father, Henry Barraud (1811–1874), and paternal uncle William Barraud (1810–1850) were well-known animal painters. Barraud's patrilineal great-grandfather, Paul Philip Barraud, was an eminent chronometer maker of Huguenot extraction, descended from an old French family that came over to England at the time of the revocation of the Edict of Nantes. Another of Barraud's paternal great-grandparents was a miniature painter. Through his mother, Anna Maria Rose, he was the nephew of George Rose (1817–1882), a dramatist, novelist, and humorous entertainer, who wrote under the pseudonym Arthur Sketchley.

Barraud was educated at Ushaw College in Durham and St. Edmund's College in Ware, Hertfordshire. Following in his father's footsteps, Barraud then pursued an artistic education, studying at Heatherley's School of Art and the Royal Academy Schools, where he was the recipient of the silver medal for life drawing. He also studied abroad at Beaux Arts in Antwerp, Belgium.

== His Master's Voice ==
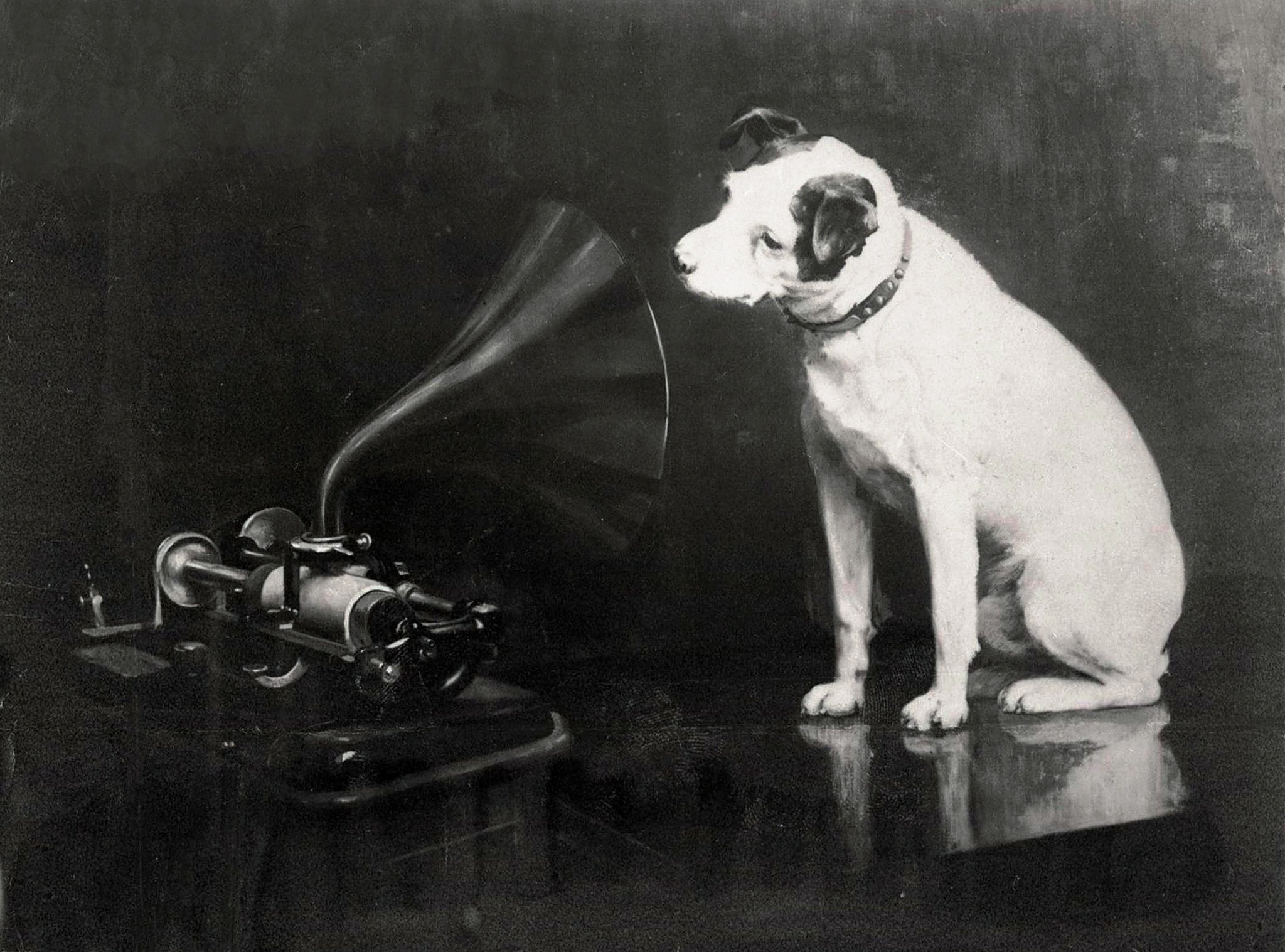
Photo of the original painting with the Edison Bell phonograph

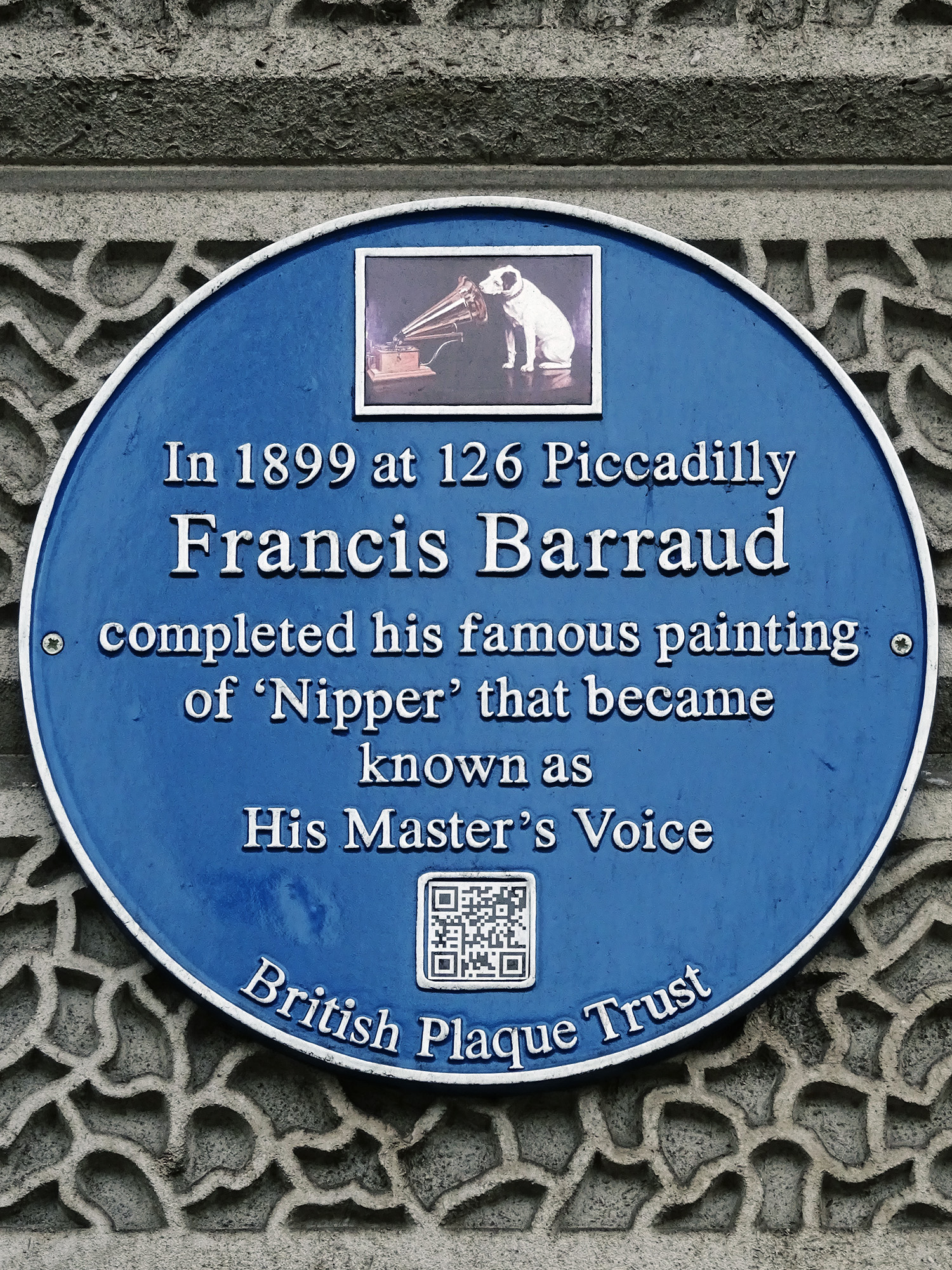
Francis Barraud's blue plaque at 126 Piccadilly

It is difficult to say how the idea came to me beyond the fact that it suddenly occurred to me that to have my dog listening to the phonograph, with an intelligent and rather puzzled expression, and call it His Master's Voice would make an excellent subject. We had a phonograph and I often noticed how puzzled he was to make out where the voice came from. It was certainly the happiest thought I ever had.

— Barraud on what inspired him to create His Master's Voice

The original painting is believed to have been created sometime between late 1898 and early 1899, when Barraud filed an application for copyright of his picture of a 'dog looking at and listening to phonograph'. A photograph of the original painting was included with the application. The dog in question was Barraud's late pet, Nipper, whom he had inherited after the premature death of his elder brother Mark (1848–1887), a Bristol stage set painter. As Nipper had died in 1895, he could not be used as a living model, so Barraud instead worked from an old photo he had. He decided on the name His Master's Voice and presented it to various publishers, hoping there would be "demand for it as a reproduction." However, there was little interest, with one man objecting on the basis that “no one would know what the dog was doing.” Barraud offered the painting to the Edison Bell company, whose commercial phonograph was depicted within the painting, but again the work was rejected, with James E. Hough of the company's London branch declaring that “dogs don't listen to phonographs.” He had also been turned down by the Royal Academy, who had previously exhibited his work.

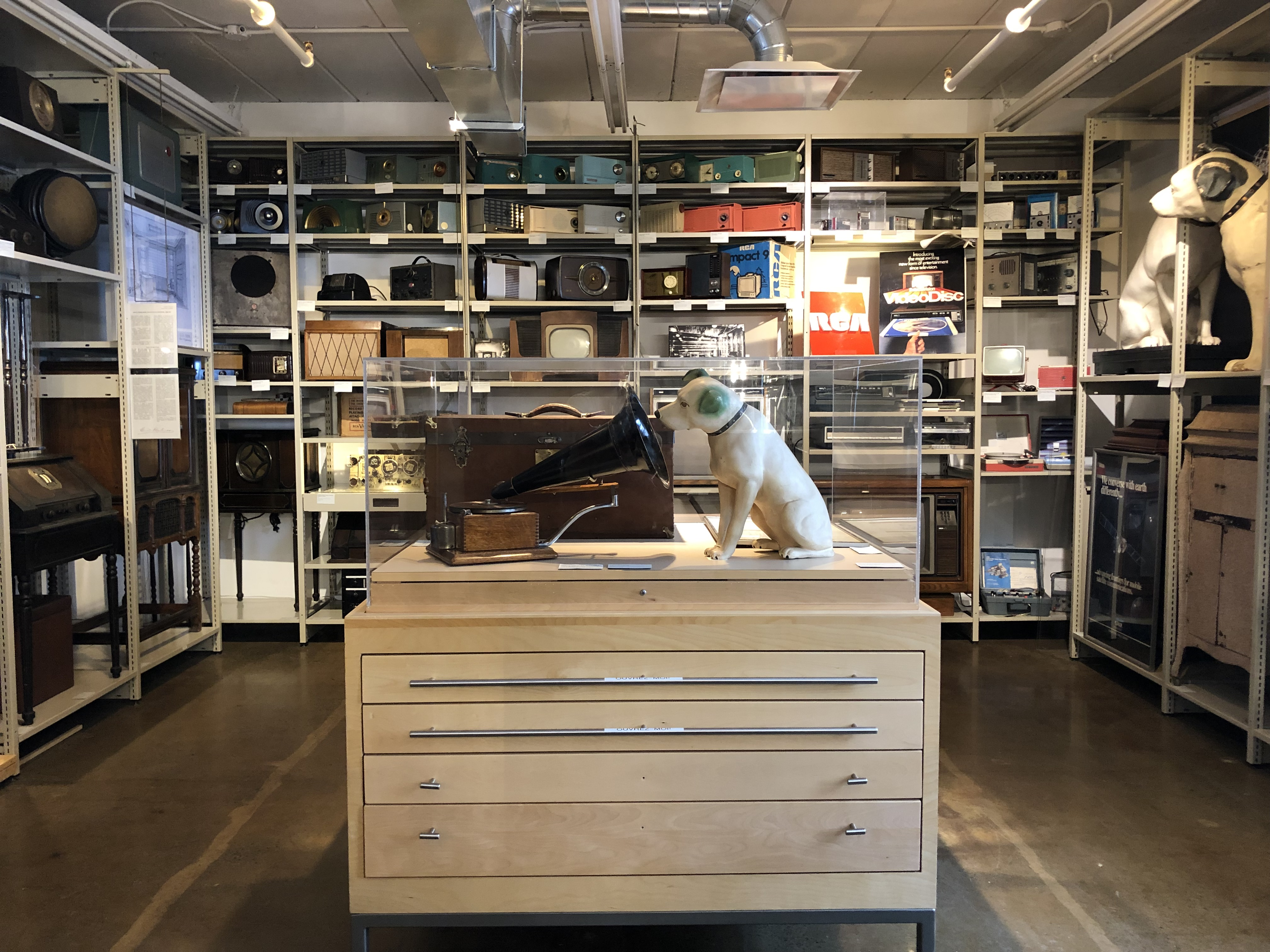
Nipper and Gramophone at the Musee des Ondes Emile Berliner

Having set aside the painting, someone then suggested to Barraud that he should replace the black trumpet with a more aesthetically-pleasing brass horn. In May 1899, he approached the Gramophone Company, whose Berliner gramophones were made with brass horns, at their Maiden Lane office in London, taking with him the photo of his original piece. William Barry Owen, head of the firm, took an interest in the painting and agreed to purchase it on the condition that the original cylinder-based phonograph be replaced with their model of disc-based gramophone. Barraud was paid £50 for the altered painting, and another £50 for the copyright (the total being equivalent to approximately £10,000 in 2019). In July 1900, the painting and phrase "His Master's Voice" were registered as trademarks in the United States and Canada by Gramophone inventor Emile Berliner before subsequently being adopted the following year by Eldridge R. Johnson, founder of the Victor Talking Machine Company, later RCA Victor, which extended the copyright further afield.

His Master's Voice would go on to become associated with the music retailer HMV, a subsidiary of the Gramophone Company. The first HMV store was opened in Oxford Street in 1921, with Barraud amongst those in attendance. In 1931, The Gramophone Company merged with the Columbia Graphophone Company to form Electric and Musical Industries Limited (EMI).

== Later life and death ==
Barraud was never able to match the success of His Master's Voice and, by 1913, he was struggling financially. Upon learning this, the Gramophone Company's Alfred Clark commissioned a replica of His Master's Voice for The Victor Talking Machine Company. Barraud subsequently developed his own successful enterprise, painting copies of His Master's Voice, many of them for executives and employees of the Victor Company in the United States.

In 1919, the Victor Company and the Gramophone Company jointly arranged for Barraud to receive a pension of £250 a year – later increased to £350 in 1924 – as a gesture of appreciation for his services.

On 29 August 1924, Barraud died in Hampstead, London and was buried in Hampstead Cemetery.

== Other works ==
Barraud was first exhibited by the Royal Academy in 1881, with a portrait of George Rose, his maternal uncle, being one of his compositions. He would become a regular exhibitor at the Academy, as well as other institutions, including the Institute of Painters in Oil Colours. An Encore Too Many (1887), one of Barraud's earlier works, was purchased by the Liverpool Corporation and is currently in the collection of the city's Walker Art Gallery.

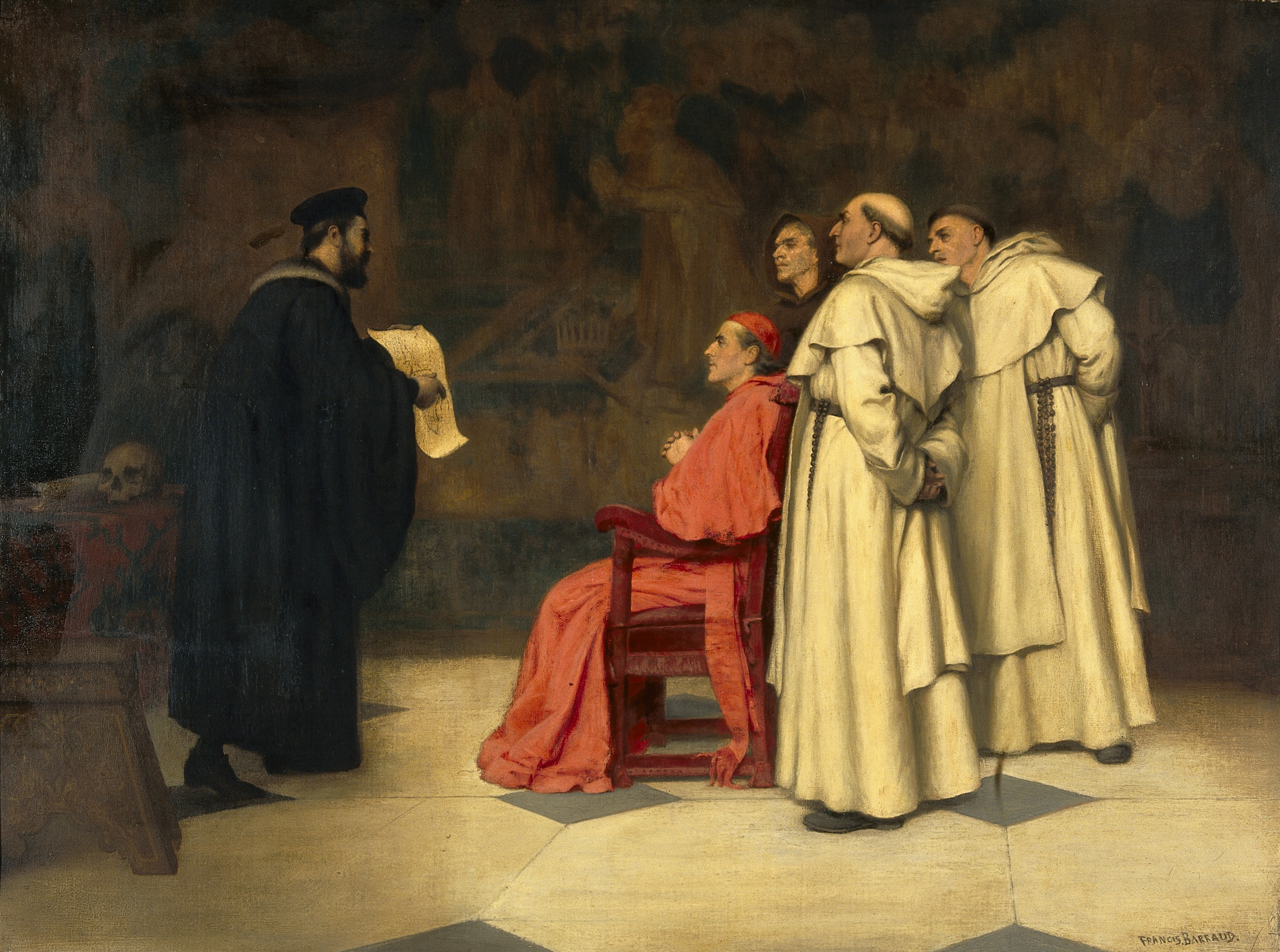
Gabriel Falloppius explaining one of his discoveries to the Cardinal Duke of Ferrara, Wellcome Collection

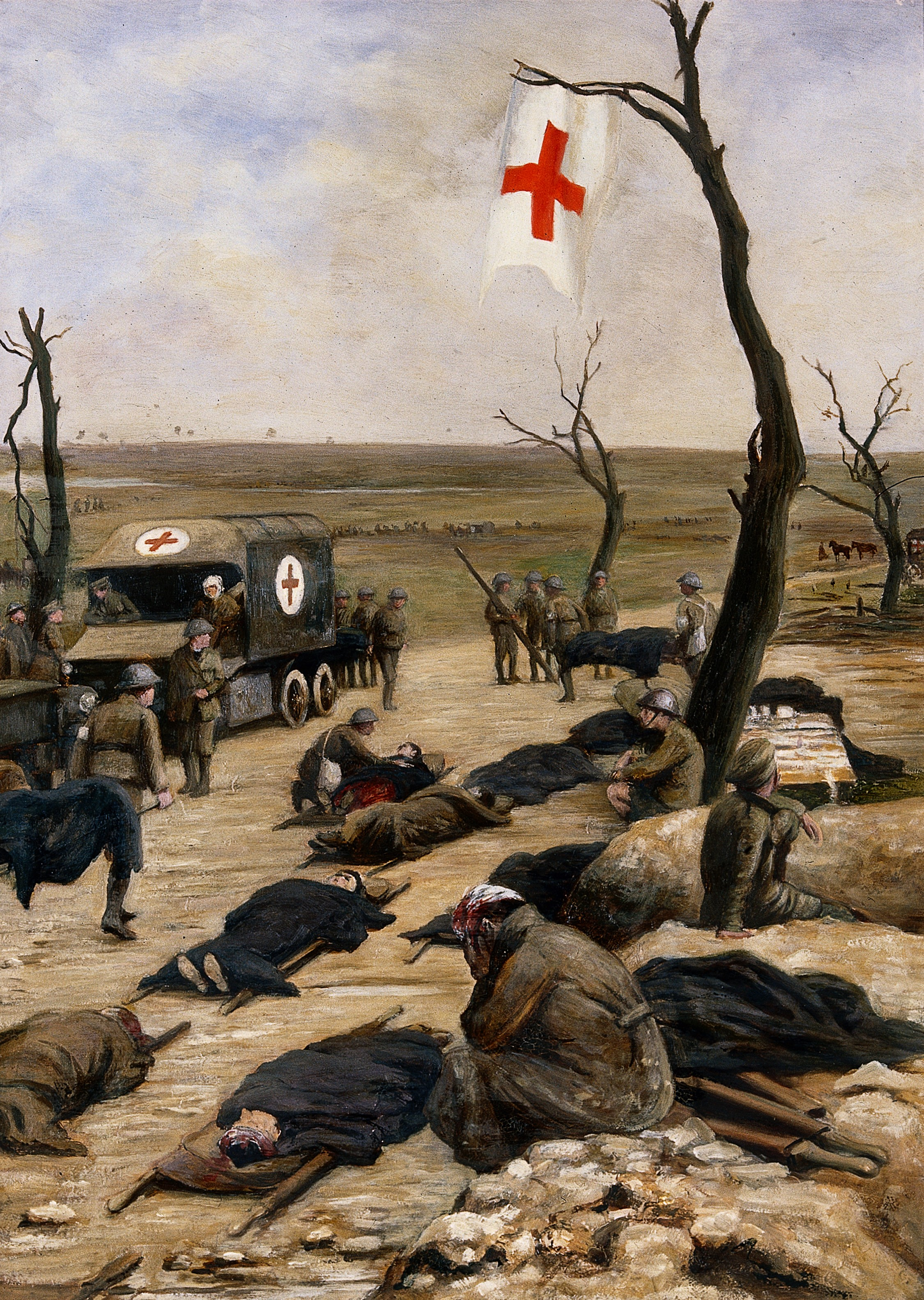
World War I: an advanced dressing-station by the roadside, Wellcome Collection

== Family ==
The writer Enid Barraud was Barraud's great-niece.
