= Henry Barraud =

Henry Barraud may refer to:

- Henry Barraud (composer) (1900–1997), French composer
- Henry Barraud (artist) (1811–1874), British painter
