= Enid Barraud =

English agricultural worker and writer (1904–1972)

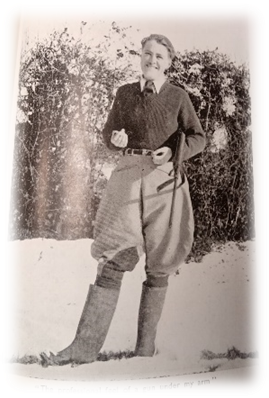
- Enid Mary Barraud - near the end of WWII
- Born: 7 February 1904
- Died: 26 July 1972; Brookfields Hospital
- Resting place: Cambridge Crematorium
- Other name: John
- Education: St Bernard's High School
- Occupations: Farm laborer (1939–), author, poet, clerk (–1939)
- Employers: Women's Land Army (1939–); University of Cambridge

Enid Mary Barraud (1904–1972) was an English woman who worked as a farm labourer with the Women's Land Army in Little Eversden, Cambridgeshire, during World War II, and wrote (as E. M. Barraud) both non-fiction and poems about her experiences. She was subsequently engaged in zoological research for the University of Cambridge.

She described herself as "mentally male, physically female" and "technically single, but 'married' in a permanent homosexual relationship with another woman", asking her friends to call her "John".

== Early life ==
Barraud was born on 7 February 1904. Her father was Henry George Frederick (Harry) Barraud (1874–1957), an insurance worker; her mother Ellen Elizabeth (née Wheeler) of Tunbridge Wells. Her patrilineal great-great-great-grandfather, Paul Philip Barraud, was an eminent chronometer maker of Huguenot extraction, descended from an old French family that came over to England at the time of the revocation of the Edict of Nantes.

She was educated at St. Bernard's High School, Westcliff-on-Sea, where in 1922 she passed the matriculation examination of the University of London.

For fifteen years prior to World War II, she worked in London as an insurance clerk. (Note: Barraud's WLA registration document gave her former occupation as "insurance shorthand typist".)

== Career ==
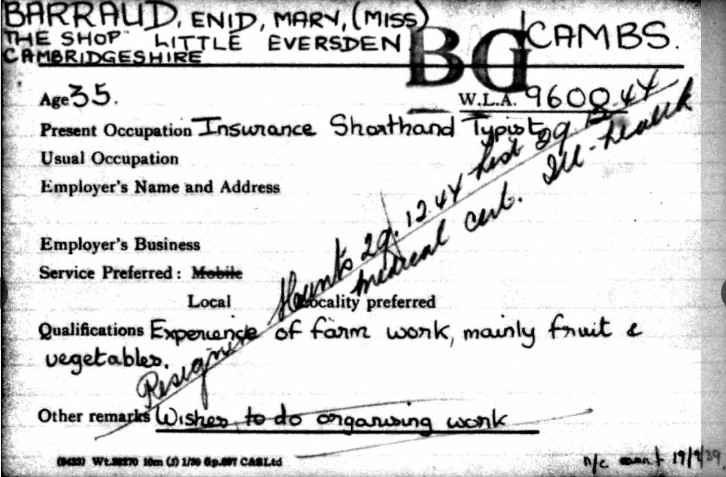
Barraud's Women's Land Army registration card, completed in September 1939 and updated on her leaving the service in December 1944

Following the outbreak of war, Barraud joined the Women's Land Army (WLA) (Note: The Women's Land Army was a British civilian organisation created to bring women into work in agriculture, replacing men called up to the military.)—one of the first thousand women to do so (Note: At its peak, in around 1944, more than 80,000 women worked in the WLA.)—on 4 September 1939, (Note: Barraud's WLA roll number was 9600) and was deployed to a farm in Little Eversden, a small village near Cambridge where earlier that year she had purchased the cottage where she lived out her life.

She wrote over 30 articles for The Manchester Guardian between 1941 and 1945, wrote in the Daily Mirror under the pen-name Hilary Johns, and wrote for a number of other publications, including Country Life, The Countryman, The Field, and Good Housekeeping. She also contributed to the WLA magazine, The Land Girl, on one occasion recalling that she had by then been running, as a volunteer, a village library in Little Eversden for five years.

Fourteen poems by Barraud, including "To The Land Girl" and "A Land Girl's Carol", were included in Poems of the Land Army: an anthology of verse by members of the Women's Land Army.

Her first book, Set My Hand Upon the Plough, published in 1946 after the war had ended, about her experiences as a "land girl" on a farm, mostly comprises reprints of her Manchester Guardian columns. It was favourably reviewed by Vita Sackville-West in The Land Girl, where she wrote:

Her voice is authentic, as well it should be after her years of close contact with the land

A second volume, Tail Corn, (Note: The title was subsequently adopted for that of Little Eversden's parish magazine.) was published in 1948. Both books were illustrated with photographs taken by Barraud. Although she did not name Little Eversden or its inhabitants in her writing, the village and people were recognisable to those involved.

After three and a half years on the farm, Barraud was dismissed as unsuitable, just as her employer was offered free labour in the form of Italian prisoners of war. She quickly found work on another farm nearby, but left the WLA in December 1944 due to the onset of rheumatism. She was very critical of the lack of support offered by the WLA following her departure.

She then joined the editorial staff of The Dairy Farmer. From 1952, she was employed by the Ornithological Field Station of the zoology department of the University of Cambridge and published several scientific papers, some about non-binary behaviour in various animal species.

Her final book, in 1967, was a history of the Barraud family. Thomas Cary Johnson of the University of Virginia described it as a:

sound, and for a genealogical treatise surprisingly amusing work... she makes no unwarranted claims. Her research is carefully documented, and where for lack of conclusive evidence she advances an hypothesis it is so designated.

== Personal life ==
Barraud had a female partner, Dorothea Rosalind Haines, known as "Bunty", and presented as male, choosing to be known as "John" to her friends, while retaining female pronouns. The couple, who had been involved in some form since at least 1937, lived in the cottage owned by Barraud on High Street, Little Eversden. In responses to the Mass-Observation project in 1939, Barraud described herself as "homosexual", and "mentally male, physically female", with "a masculine point of view". On another occasion, she wrote to Mass-Observation that she was "technically single, but 'married' in a permanent homosexual relationship with another woman". (Note: Although homosexuality between men was illegal at this time, there was no law against female homosexuality.)

Barraud died on 26 July 1972 at Brookfields Hospital, Cambridge, aged 68 and was cremated at Cambridge Crematorium, where her ashes were then scattered. Bunty remained in Little Eversden until moving to a care home at Toft, and died in 1987.

Barraud had a brother, Philip, who survived her; their great-uncle was the painter, Francis Barraud, whose His Master's Voice painting she researched. The depicted dog, Nipper, originally belonged to Mark Henry Barraud (1848–87), Enid and Philip's grandfather and the older brother of Francis. Mark and Francis' father was Henry Barraud, a noted artist.

She was a Fellow of The Huguenot Society of London, to which some of her papers were donated after her death.

== Legacy ==
Reviewing Barraud's life in 2026, Lottie Wood of The Museum of English Rural Life noted:

Set My Hand Upon the Plough touches on concerns as vast as the educational disadvantages of rural children, the inadequacy of pastoral literature in representing agricultural life, and environmental anxieties relating to farmland management, whilst largely being a day-to-day account of her working life on the farm. Yet one current that runs throughout Barraud's memoir of rural work is her comprehensive adaptation to rural life, where her nonconforming identity does not conflict against her role in the ranks of the Women's Land Army, but instead burgeons alongside the rural environment around her.

Theano Manoli, a librarian of the Royal Agricultural University considers that the book:

...joins the ranks of LGBT memoirs, casting new light on the lives of the men and women who fought or who worked on the home front and their vital role in the liberation of Europe.

It was republished in 2024, with a new introduction by Luke Turner. Together with Tail Corn, it has been recognised for its use of Cambridgeshire dialect.

In 2025, information on Barraud was included in an Imperial War Museum self-guided digital tour, "Refracted Histories: Exploring LGBTQ+ Stories in Times of Conflict".

A play Call Me John – words, sounds and images from the life of E. M. Barraud, WWII land girl, based on research by Jane Bower including oral history and family interviews, premiered in July 2026.

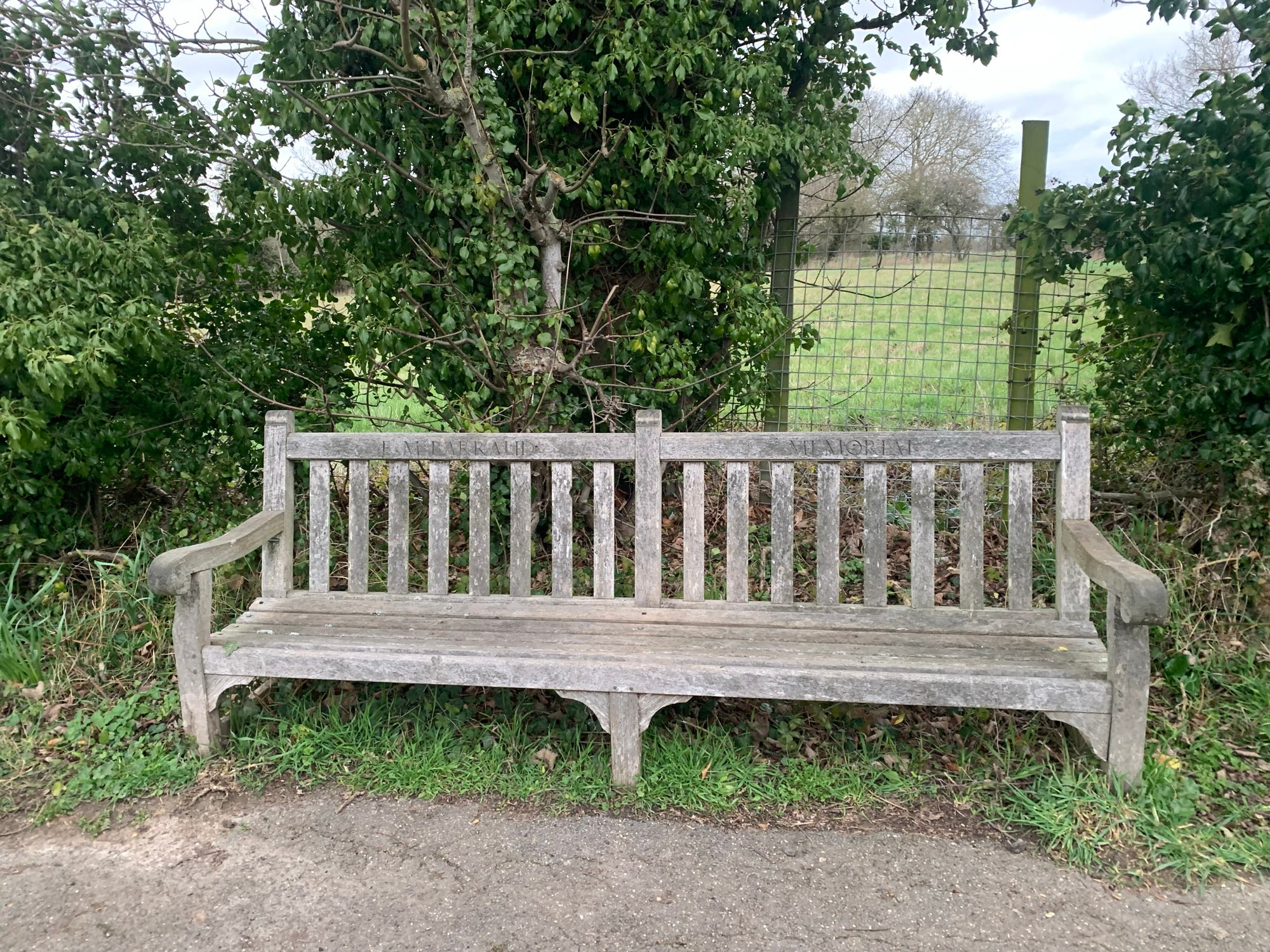
Memorial bench to E. M. Barraud at Little Eversden

There is a memorial bench in Barraud's memory, at Little Eversden, beside the path to Great Eversden. (Note: Memorial bench coordinates: 52.16143°N 0.003760°E)

== Selected works ==
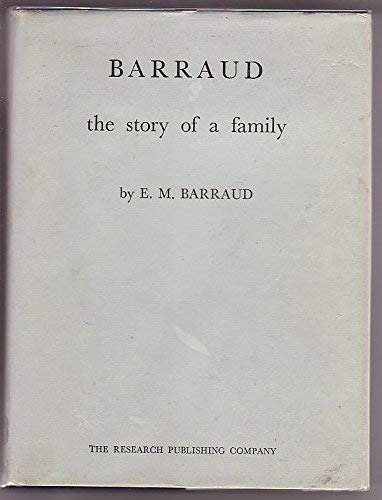
Barraud : The Story of a Family

- Set My Hand Upon the Plough. Worcester: Littlebury & Co. 1946.
- Tail Corn. London: Chapman & Hall. 1948.
- What Flower is That?. Worcester: Littlebury & Co. 1952.
- Barraud: The story of a family. The Research Publishing Co. 1967.

=== Papers ===
- "Wing Clapping of Turtle-Dove". British Birds. 39 (9): 284. September 1946.
- "Sexual Behavior Occurring as Overflow Activity in Juvenile House Sparrow". British Birds. 46: 382. 1953.
- "The Crossbill invasion of Great Britain in 1953". British Birds. 49 (8): 289–298. August 1956.
- "The Copulatory Behaviour of the Freshwater Snail (Lymnaea stagnalis L.)". British Journal of Animal Behaviour (5): 55–59. 1957. doi:10.1016/S0950-5601(57)80027-6.
- "Why Does an Animal Behave as It Does?". New Scientist. Vol. 4, no. 98. October 1958. p. 969.
- "The Development of Behaviour in Some Young Passerines". Bird Study. 8 (3): 111–118. 1961. doi:10.1080/00063656109475995.
