= Thomas Fairland =

English painter

- Born: 1804
- Died: October 1852 (aged 47–48); London, England
- Resting place: Kensal Green Cemetery
- Education: Royal Academy Schools

Thomas Fairland (1804 – October 1852) was an English lithographer, engraver and portrait painter.

== Life and work ==
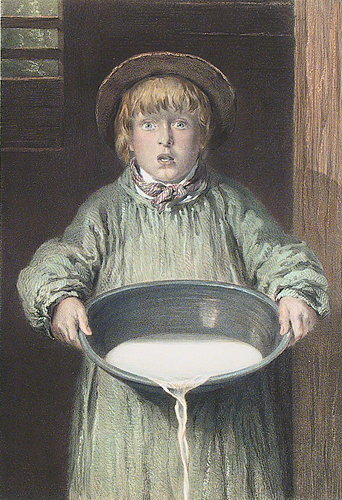
Astonishment (1870s lithograph after W. H. Hunt)

Fairland showed an early interest in drawing and practiced from nature in Kensington Gardens in London. He subsequently became a student of the Royal Academy under Henry Fuseli and gained a silver medal for drawing from the cast of Hercules which stood in the entrance hall of the academy building. Turning his attention to line engraving, he became a pupil of Charles Warren but was more attracted by the new art of lithography in which he produced some very good works. Among these may be noted:

- "The recruit - or who'll serve the king", "The Village Champion" and "Left leg foremost (from pictures by Robert Farrier, 1796-1879),
- "The poacher's confederate" (after Charles Hancock, 1802-1877),
- "The Rat catcher" (after Abraham Cooper),
- "The Sportsman's Exhibition - a series of heads of the principal British sporting dogs" (from pictures by Sir Edwin Landseer, Abraham Cooper and Charles Hancock).

A Volume of comic sketches, after William Henry Hunt, attained great popularity. However, his most important work and one of the best ever executed in lithography, was the cartoon of the Virgin and Child (known as the Rodgers Madonna) by Raphael.

Other subjects lithographed included "The Misers" (after Quentin Matsys), "Napoleon crossing the Alps" (after Jacques-Louis David), "Imogene" (after Richard Westall), and various portraits. He also worked with artist William Barraud to produce a volume called "The book of animals drawn from nature" (C. Tilt, 1846). However, owing to the decline of lithography due to foreign competition and the vagaries of fashion, Fairland now devoted himself to portrait painting, and enjoyed the patronage of many eminent people including royalty.

He struggled however with money and ill-health, and died from tuberculosis (known then as Consumption) in October 1852, aged 49. He was buried in Kensal Green Cemetery.

William Fairland, who it is thought was his brother, also practiced as a lithographer and executed "The Culprit detected" (after Robert Farrier - published 1831), "The Lovers Vigil" (after Robert Smirke) and others. He also did work on anatomical subjects.
