= St Bernard's High School, Westcliff-on-Sea =

St Bernard's High School

Location
- Milton Road; Westcliff-on-Sea, Essex, SS0 7JS; England; 51.5374°N 0.6986°E

Information
- Type: Academy
- Motto: Love one another as I have loved you
- Religious affiliation: Roman Catholic
- Established: 1910
- Local authority: Southend-on-Sea
- Department for Education URN: 137312 Tables
- Ofsted: Reports
- Headmistress: Helen Barnes
- Gender: Girls
- Age: 11 to 18
- Houses: Annay; Clairvaux; Fountains; Melrose; Rievaulx; Hyning
- Website: http://www.stbernardswestcliff.org.uk

St Bernard's Convent High School is a girls Catholic bilateral secondary school located in Westcliff-on-Sea, Essex, with a mixed sixth form.

== History ==
There has been a Catholic school on the site since 1875, however it was in 1910 that St. Bernard's Convent High School was created on the premises for young ladies by a group of Bernardine Sisters. St Bernard's school celebrated its centenary in 2010.

In 2004 St. Bernard's school achieved Specialist Arts status, and in 2008 a Specialist Science status was also achieved. The school became an academy in 2011.

== Emblem ==
The school's emblem, which is featured on the school uniform as well as headed on letters from the school, is three swords within a double diamond. Below the diamond reads "Dieu Mon Abri" meaning "God Is My Shelter" in French.

== Houses ==
There are currently 6 forms per year from years 7 to 11. Students in these years are placed in one of 6 different houses. These houses are: "A", "C", "F", "M" "R" and "H", which stand for Annay, Clairvaux, Fountains, Melrose, Rievaulx and Hyning, these being abbeys or monasteries which are in some way connected to Saint Bernard.

== Notable former pupils ==
- Enid Barraud, writer
- Gemma Craven, actress
- Dame Helen Mirren, actress
- Anne Stallybrass, actress
