= Charles Barraud =

Swiss painter (1897–1997)

- Born: 19 April 1897; La Chaux-de-Fonds, Switzerland
- Died: 29 January 1997 (aged 99); Yverdon-les-Bains, Switzerland
- Known for: Painting
- Spouse(s): Jeanne Pellet, Paulette Kühni

Charles Barraud (19 April 1897 – 29 January 1997) was a Swiss painter from the canton of Neuchâtel.

== Biography ==
Barraud was born on 19 April 1897, at La Chaux-de-Fonds, eldest of several brothers, the sons of an engraver of watch plates, at least four of whom became artists. Between 1910 and 1914, Charles followed an apprenticeship as an engraver while attending the art school of La Chaux-de-Fonds in the evenings, as did his brothers. When his father became ill in 1918 he worked with his brothers in the local workshops, then spent some time in Geneva with Albert Locca. In 1921, he was awarded a state scholarship in fine arts. In 1926, he opened a picture framing business and married his first wife, Jeanne Pellet (known as Janebé). Their daughter Marie-Louise (Malou) was born in 1930.

After some time spent in Tunisia in 1935 he obtained a second state grant in 1936 and in the following year visited Algeria. From 1940, when he moved to Areuse, he had several very productive years before moving to Cortaillod in 1946.

In 1951, he married his second wife, Paulette Kühni. In the same year he took part in a joint exhibition of works by the four Barraud brothers in Paris (repeated in 1961 at La Chaux-de-Fonds) and bought a house in Blauzac. After several exhibitions, including a retrospective at the Musée des beaux-arts of La Chaux-de-Fonds in 1958, he made another visit to Algeria in 1973 and to Tunisia in 1989. His last paintings date from 1995.

He died in hospital at Yverdon-les-Bains, on 29 January 1997, aged 99.

== See also ==
- Aimé Barraud
- François Barraud

== Sources ==
- Comtesse, Gérald, 1997: Charles Barraud, Éditions Gilles Attinger: Hauterive
- Éditions Gilles Attinger (in French)
