= Victor Talking Machine Company =

Former American record and phonograph manufacturer

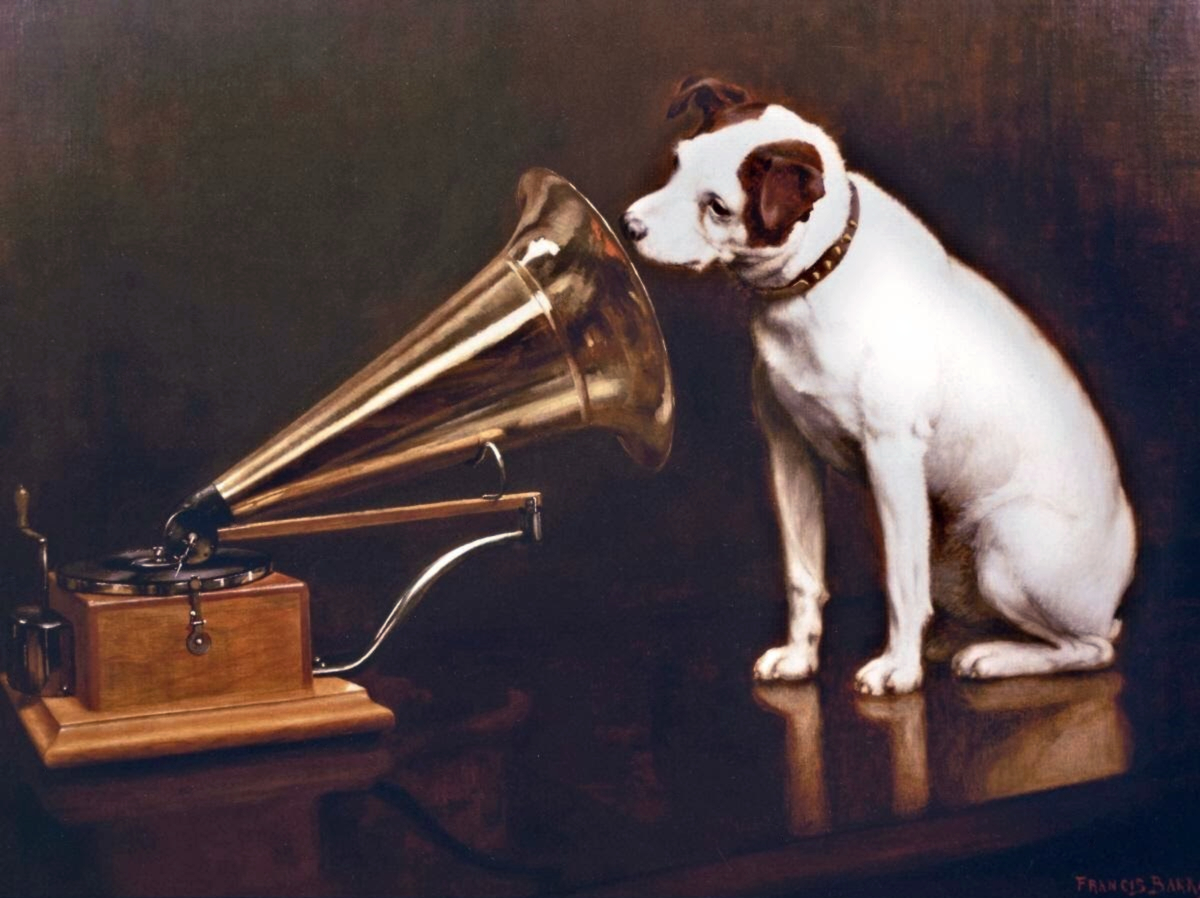
- "His Master's Voice" logo with Nipper
- Founded: 1901; 125 years ago
- Founder: Eldridge R. Johnson, Emile Berliner
- Status: Acquired by RCA in 1929; known today as RCA Records
- Genre: Classical, blues, popular, jazz, country, bluegrass, folk
- Country of origin: United States
- Location: Camden, New Jersey

The Victor Talking Machine Company was an American recording company and phonograph manufacturer, incorporated in 1901. Victor was an independent enterprise until 1929 when it merged with the Radio Corporation of America (RCA) and became the RCA Victor Division of the Radio Corporation of America.

Established in Camden, New Jersey, Victor was one of the largest and most prestigious recording companies in the world, best known for its iconic "His Master's Voice" trademark, the design, production and marketing of the popular "Victrola" line of phonographs and the company's extensive catalog of operatic and classical music recordings by world famous artists on the prestigious Red Seal label. After Victor merged with RCA in 1929, the company maintained its eminence as America's foremost producer of records and phonographs until the 1960s.

== History ==
In 1896, Emile Berliner, the inventor of the gramophone and disc record, contracted Eldridge R. Johnson, owner of a small machine shop in Camden, New Jersey, to manufacture a spring-driven motor for the gramophone. Johnson immediately became fascinated with the gramophone, and over the next several years developed a number of improvements for it and the process of disc recording. In 1900, Johnson formed the Consolidated Talking Machine Company of Philadelphia which, after lengthy and complex patent litigations, was reorganized in 1901 as the Victor Talking Machine Company in Camden, New Jersey.

=== Name ===
There are different accounts as to how the "Victor" name came about. RCA historian Fred Barnum gives various possible origins of the name. In "His Master's Voice" In America he writes: "One story claims that Johnson considered his first improved Gramophone to be both a scientific and business 'victory'. A second account is that Johnson emerged as the 'Victor' in 1901, from the long and costly litigations involving Berliner's gramophone patents and Frank Seaman's Zonophone. A third story is that Johnson's partner, Leon Douglass, derived the word from his wife's name 'Victoria'. Finally, a fourth story is that Johnson took the name from the popular 'Victor' bicycle, which he had admired for its superior engineering. Of these four accounts, the first two are the most generally accepted." The first use of the Victor name was on a letterhead dated March 28, 1901.

==== Marketing ====
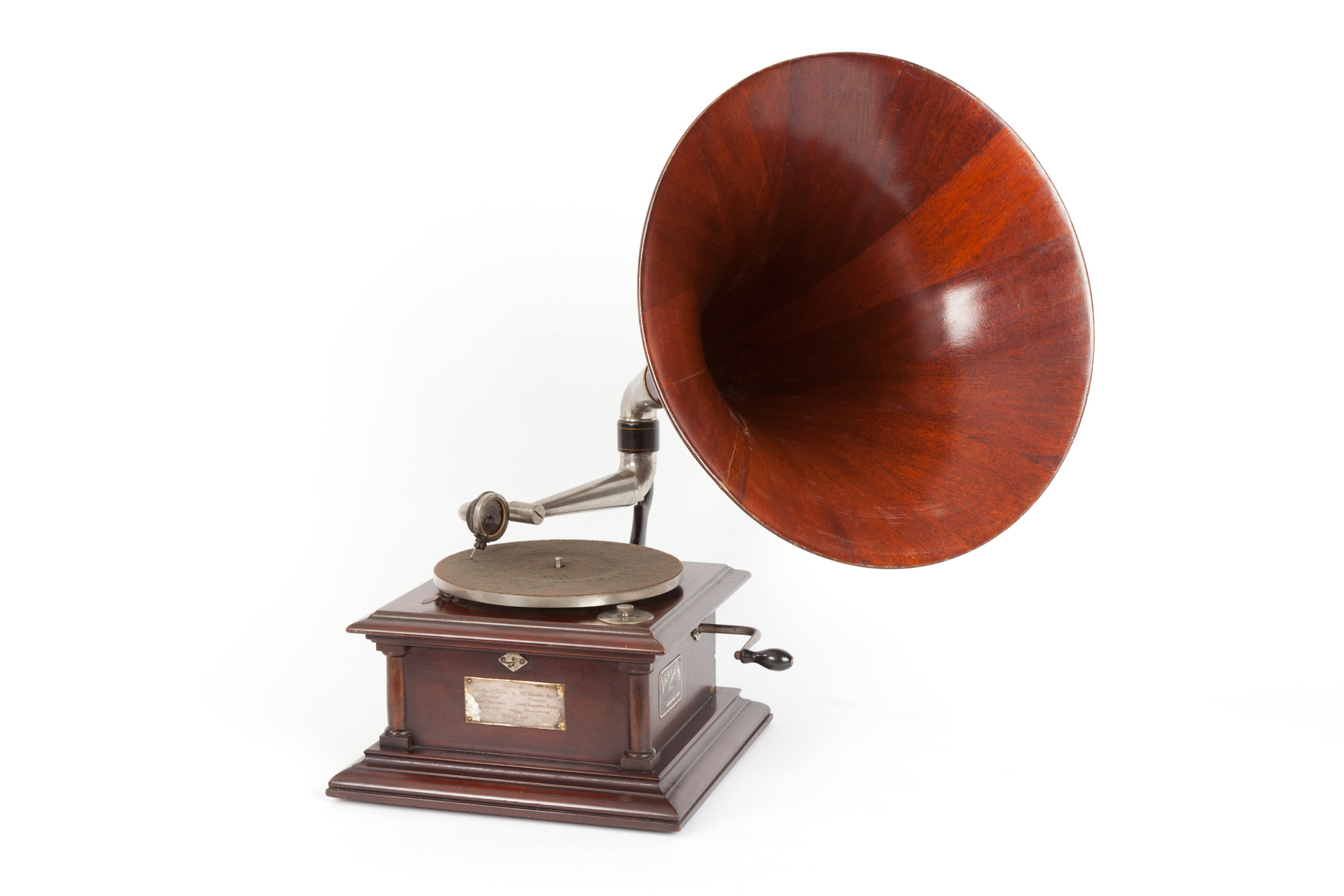
Victor IV gramophone. Museo Nazionale Scienza e Tecnologia Leonardo da Vinci, Milan.

Francis James Barraud's deceased brother, a London photographer, willed him his estate, including his DC-powered Edison-Bell cylinder phonograph with a case of cylinders, and his dog, named Nipper. Barraud's original painting depicts Nipper peering quizzically into the horn of an Edison-Bell phonograph. Barraud titled the painting "His Master's Voice". The horn on the Edison-Bell machine was black, and after a failed attempt at selling the painting to a cylinder record supplier of Edison Phonographs in the UK, it was suggested to Barraud that the painting might be brightened up (and possibly made more marketable) by substituting one of the brass-belled horns on display in the window at the new gramophone shop on Maiden Lane. The Gramophone Company in London was founded and managed by an American, William Barry Owen. One day in 1899, Barraud paid a visit to the shop with a photograph of the painting and asked to borrow a brass horn. Owen lent Barraud a horn and asked him to bring along his painting when he returned it. When Owen was shown the canvas a few days later, he offered to buy it if Barraud would paint out the cylinder machine and substitute a disc Gramophone. Barraud agreed to modify the canvas but he did not completely eradicate all remnants of his original brushwork. On close inspection of the painting, the contours of the Edison-Bell phonograph are visible beneath the paint of the gramophone. Emile Berliner acquired a United States copyright for the picture in 1900 and Eldridge Johnson adopted the Nipper/"His Master's Voice" trademark for use by Consolidated and the following year, for Victor.

In 1915, the "His Master's Voice" logo was rendered in immense circular leaded-glass windows in the tower of the Victrola cabinet building at Victor's headquarters in Camden, New Jersey. The building still stands today with replica windows installed during RCA's ownership of the plant in its later years. Today, one of the original windows is located at the Smithsonian museum in Washington, D.C.

=== Acoustical recording era (1901–1925) ===
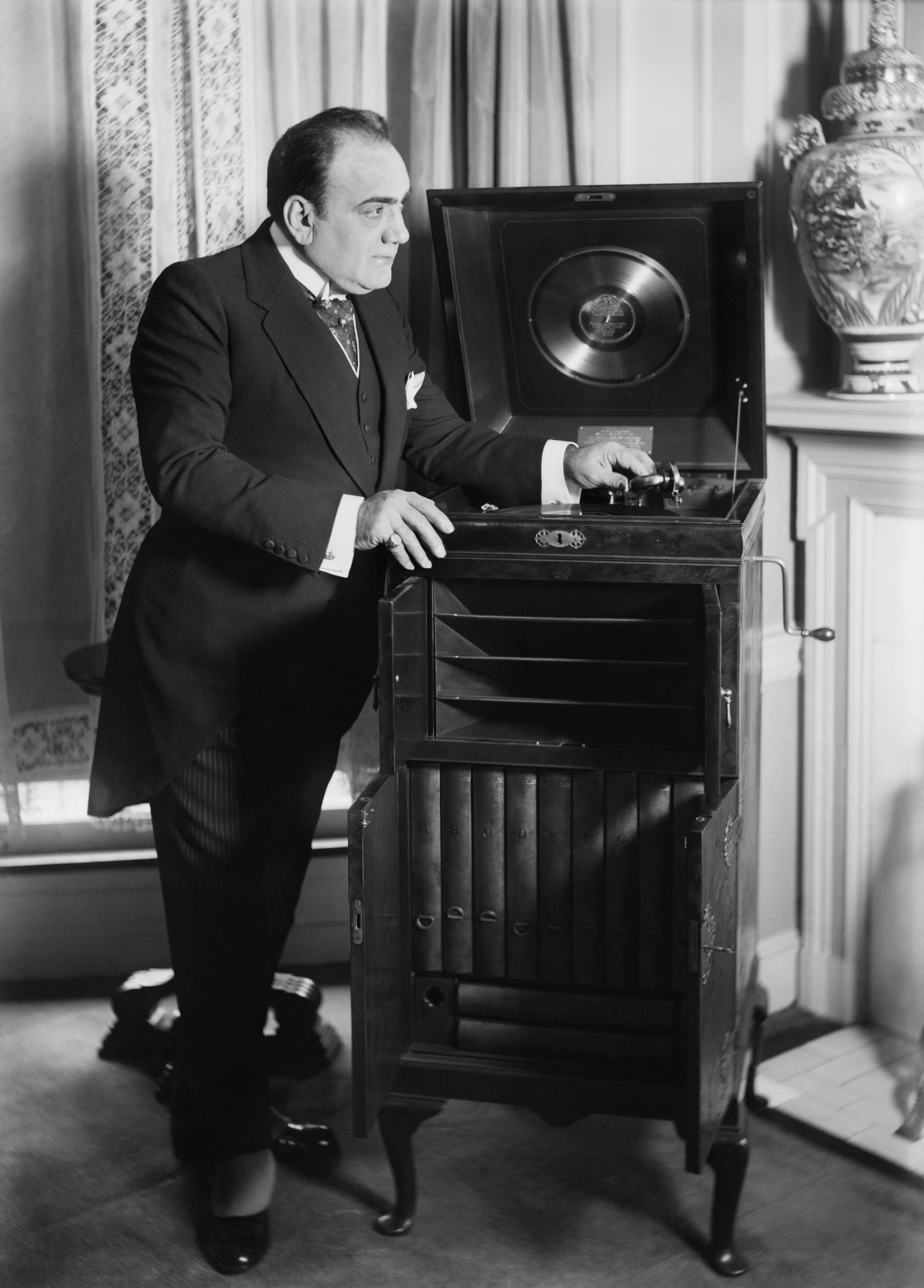
Enrico Caruso with a customized Victrola given to him as a wedding gift by the Victor Company in 1918

In the company's early years, Victor issued recordings on the Victor, Monarch and De Luxe labels, with the Victor label on 7-inch records, Monarch on 10-inch records and De Luxe on 12-inch records. De Luxe Special 14-inch records were briefly marketed in 1903–1904. In 1905, all labels and sizes were consolidated into the Victor imprint. In 1906, 8-inch records were introduced and sold until 1909, also with the Victor label.

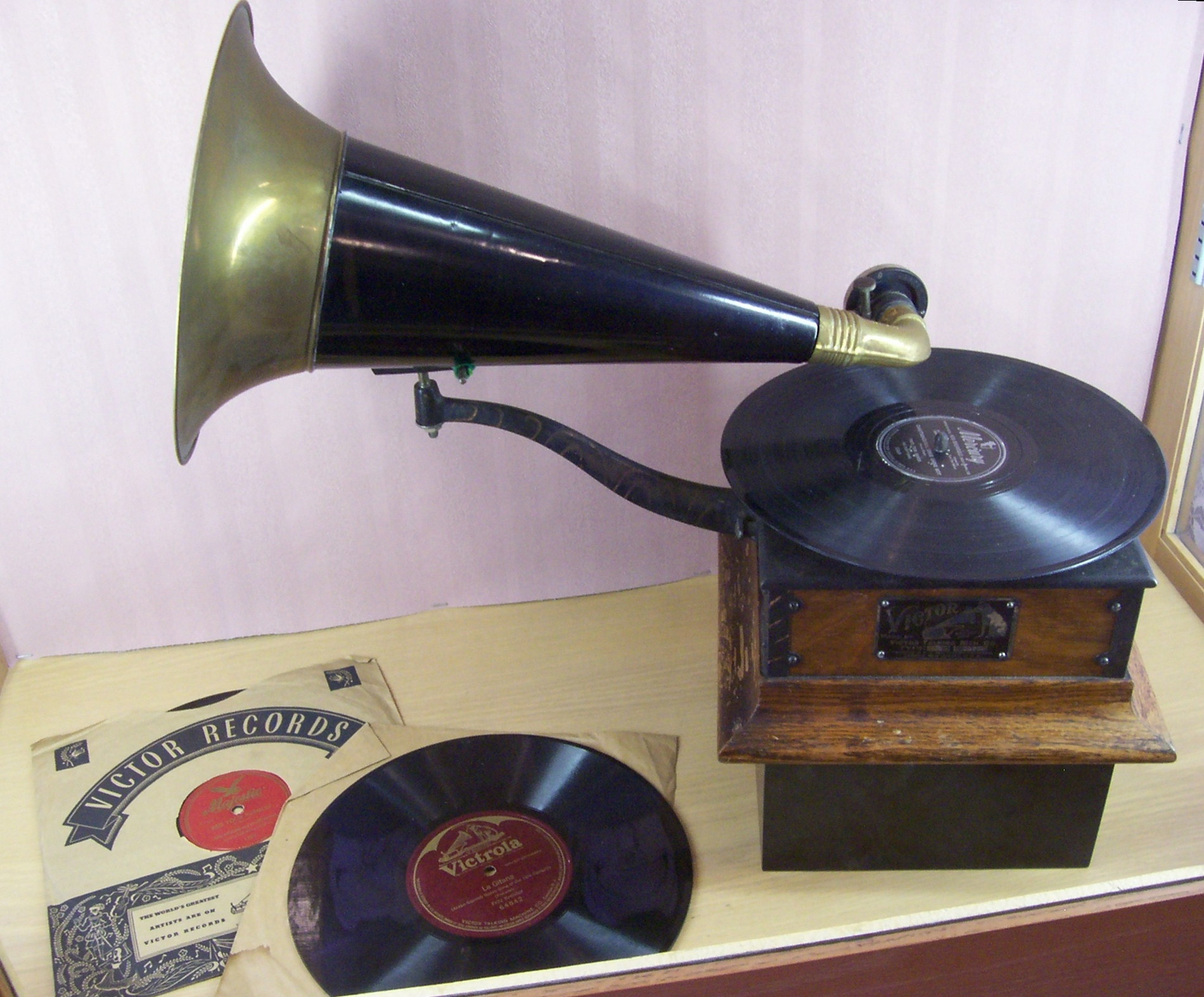
A Victor Talking Machine

Victor recorded the first jazz and blues records ever issued. The Victor Military Band recorded the first recorded blues song, "The Memphis Blues", on July 15, 1914, in Camden, New Jersey. In 1917, The Original Dixieland Jazz Band recorded "Livery Stable Blues".

=== Electrical recording era and acquisition by RCA (1925–1929) ===
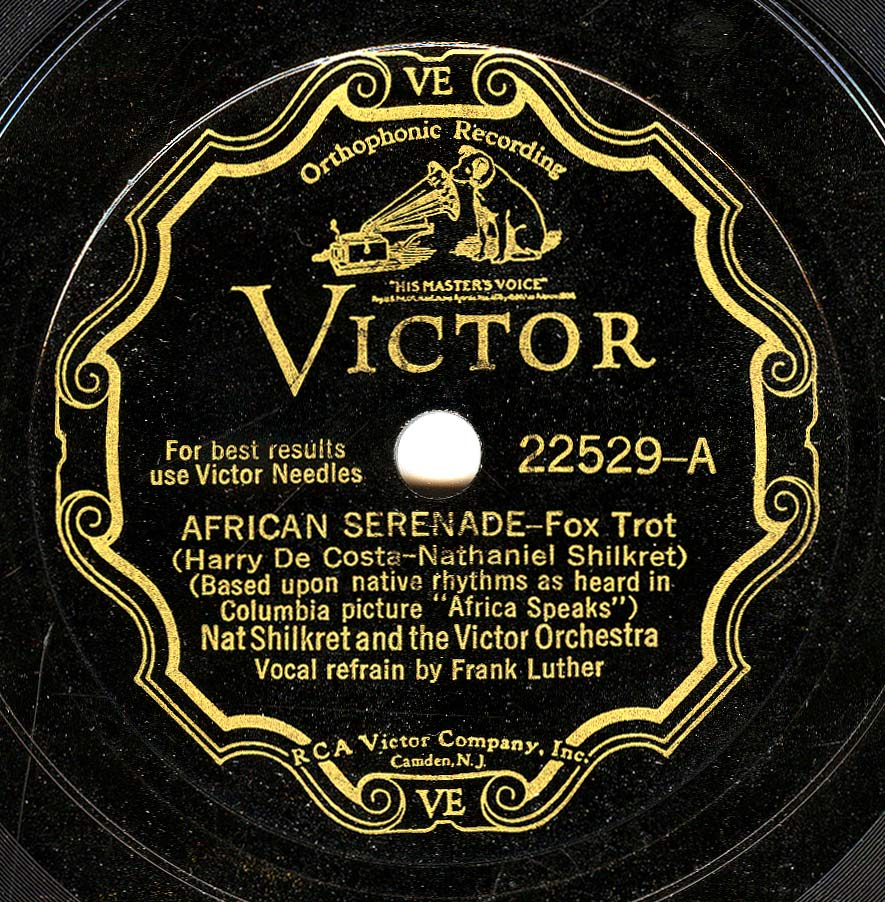
Victor "scroll" label used from 1926 to 1934, featuring the company's house band directed by Nathaniel Shilkret

In the early 1920s, the advent of radio as a home entertainment medium presented Victor and the entire record industry with new challenges. Not only was music becoming available over the air free of charge, but live radio broadcasts using high-quality microphones and heard over amplified receivers provided sound that was startlingly more clear and realistic than any contemporary phonograph record. Eldridge Johnson and Victor's senior executives were initially dismissive of the encroachments of radio, but after plummeting sales and their apathy and resistance of radio and electrical recording brought the company to the brink of bankruptcy in 1925, Victor switched from the acoustical or mechanical method of recording to the new microphone-based electrical system developed by Western Electric. Victor called its version of the improved fidelity recording process "Orthophonic", and marketed a new line of phonographs referred to as "Orthophonic Victrolas", scientifically developed by Western Electric to play these new records. Victor's first electrical recordings, issued in the spring of 1925 were not advertised as such; in order to create an extensive catalog of records made by the new process to satisfy anticipated demand, and to allow dealers time to liquidate their stocks of old-style Victrolas, Victor and its longtime rival, Columbia Records, agreed to keep electrical recording secret until the autumn of 1925. Then, with the company's largest advertising campaign to date, Victor publicly announced the new technology and introduced its new records and the Orthophonic Victrola on November 2, 1925, dubbed "Victor Day".

The "VE" symbol, indicating a Victor electrical recording

Victor's first commercial electrical recording was made at the company's Camden, New Jersey studios on February 26, 1925. A group of eight popular Victor artists, Billy Murray, Frank Banta, Henry Burr, Albert Campbell, Frank Croxton, John Meyer, Monroe Silver, and Rudy Wiedoeft gathered to record "A Miniature Concert". Several takes were recorded by the old acoustical process, then additional takes were recorded electrically for test purposes. The electrical recordings turned out well, and Victor issued the results that summer as the two sides of twelve inch 78 rpm disc, Victor 35753. Victor's first electrical recording to be issued was Victor 19626, a ten-inch record, directed by Nathaniel Shilkret, consisting of two numbers recorded on March 16, 1925, from the University of Pennsylvania's thirty-seventh annual production of the Mask and Wig Club, released in April, 1925. On March 21, 1925, Victor recorded its first electrical Red Seal disc, twelve inch 6502 by French pianist Alfred Cortot, of works by Chopin and Schubert.

In 1926, Johnson sold his controlling (but not holding) interest in the Victor Company to the banking firms of JW Seligman and Speyer & Co., who in turn sold Victor to the Radio Corporation of America in 1929.

=== Victor Light Opera Company ===
Walter B. Rogers joined Victor in 1904. He organized an in house staff ensemble called the Victor Light Opera Company to sing "Gems" or medleys from musical comedies, popular operettas, revues, and early musical motion pictures. They also performed some excerpts from grand opera as the Victor Opera Company. From 1909 into the 1930s, the rotating ensemble of talent recorded the "Gems" series from nearly one hundred different shows. The group's output shifted from the operetta hits of the 1910s to the works of 1920s songwriters, including recordings from productions such as "Sunny" and "The Desert Song". The VLOC provided recordings of Irving Berlin's score for the Marx Brothers' 1925 Broadway show The Cocoanuts. These recordings are the only contemporary audio documentation of the Marx Brothers' original Broadway offerings, as original cast recordings were not yet a standard industry practice.

"Gems" were arrangements of fragments or medleys of selected numbers. A purchaser could expect to hear snatches of the most popular tunes and choruses, usually ending with an up-tempo number. Production of these records required several singers to collaborate by stepping forward at the proper time to sing solos into the horn and back for choral numbers. A typical "Gems" recording played for around four and a half minutes on one side of a 12-inch, 78 rpm record; occasionally, shows or operas contained enough material to merit two sides of a record. Periodically, Victor re-recorded many of the popular "Gems" records, often more than once, but issued them under the same catalog numbers.

== Archives ==
The Discography of American Historical Recordings (DAHR) is a continuation of the Encyclopedic Discography of Victor Recordings (EDVR) project by Ted Fagan and William Moran to make a complete discography of all Victor recordings as well as adding the recordings of Columbia, Brunswick and other historic American labels now controlled by Sony Music Entertainment. The Victor archive files are the main source of information for this project.

In 2011, the Library of Congress and Victor catalog owner Sony Music Entertainment launched the National Jukebox offering streaming audio of more than 10,000 pre-1925 recorded works for listening by the general public; the majority of these recordings have not been widely available for over 100 years.

== See also ==
- Eldridge R. Johnson – American businessman and inventor (1867-1945)
- Grammy Award – American award for achievements in music
- His Master's Voice – Entertainment trademark
- Johnson Victrola Museum – State park in Delaware, United States
- List of phonograph manufacturers
- Nipper – Dog featured on the His Master's Voice trademark
- RCA Camden – Budget record label
- RCA Records – American record label
- RCA Red Seal – US record label
- RCA Victrola
