= Henry Barraud (artist) =

English portrait, subject and animal painter

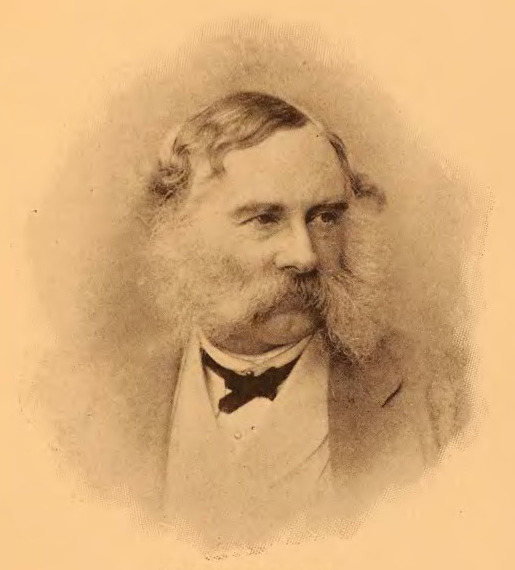
- Born: 16 May 1811; London
- Died: 17 June 1874 (aged 63); London
- Known for: Painting
- Children: Francis Barraud, Herbert Rose Barraud
- Relatives: William Barraud

Henry Barraud (16 May 1811 – 17 June 1874) was a British portrait, subject, and animal painter.

== Early life ==
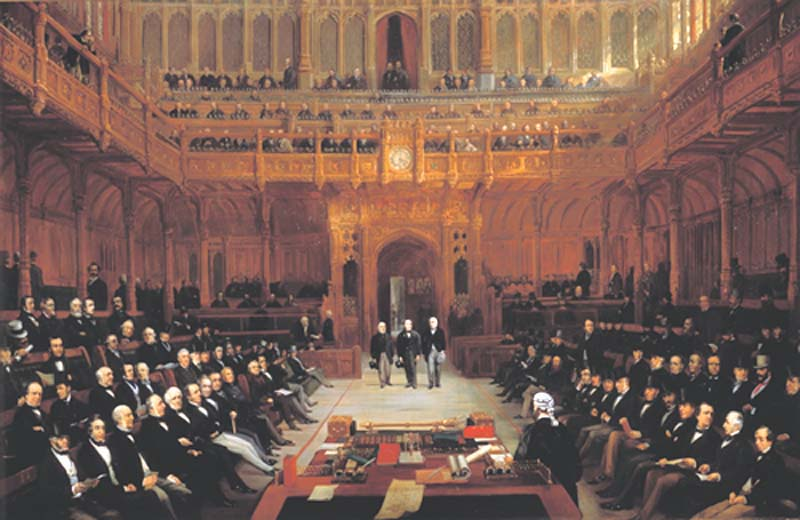
Painting by Barraud, 1872, depicting Lionel Nathan de Rothschild introduced in the House of Commons on 26 July 1858 by Lord John Russell and Mr Abel Smith (1872)

Barraud was born in London, one of 17 children of William Francis Barraud (1783–1833), a clerk in the Custom House, and Sophia (née) Hull. His paternal grandfather was Paul Philip Barraud an eminent chronometer maker in Cornhill, and his maternal grandfather, Thomas Hull, a miniature painter. The family was of French Huguenot origin that had come over to England at the time of the revocation of the Edict of Nantes. His elder brother William Barraud became a notable animal painter. Another brother, Edward, also had a talent for art, but did not pursue it professionally.

Like his brother, Henry excelled in painting animals, but his works were chiefly portraits, with horses and dogs, and subject pictures, such as The Pope Blessing the Animals (1842), many of which were executed in conjunction with his brother. He exhibited at the Royal Academy from 1833 to 1859, and at the British Institution and Society of British Artists between the years 1831 and 1868. The two brothers shared a studio from 1835 until William's death in 1850, and in their joint pictures William painted the animals and Henry the figures. They also produced a book entitled Sketches of Figures and Animals (H. Graves and Co., c.1850).

== Works ==
Barraud's most popular works were: We Praise Thee, O God, featuring a trio of child choir members; The London Season, a Scene in Hyde Park; Lord's Cricket Ground; and The Lobby of the House of Commons (painted in 1872), all of which were engraved or autotyped. He was also commissioned to paint several royal portraits. He was also a photographer and painted some of his subjects, including Lord Palmerston, from photographs.

== Death ==
Barraud died at his home in Gloucester Place, London on 17 June 1874, in his sixty-fourth year.

== Personal life ==
His son Francis Barraud (1856–1924) was also an artist—best remembered for his painting of "Nipper" the dog on the "His Master's Voice" entertainment trademark. Another son Herbert Rose Barraud (1845 – c1896) was a noted portrait photographer. The writer Enid Barraud, who published a book on the Barraud family, was his great-granddaughter.
