= François Barraud =

Swiss painter (1899–1934)

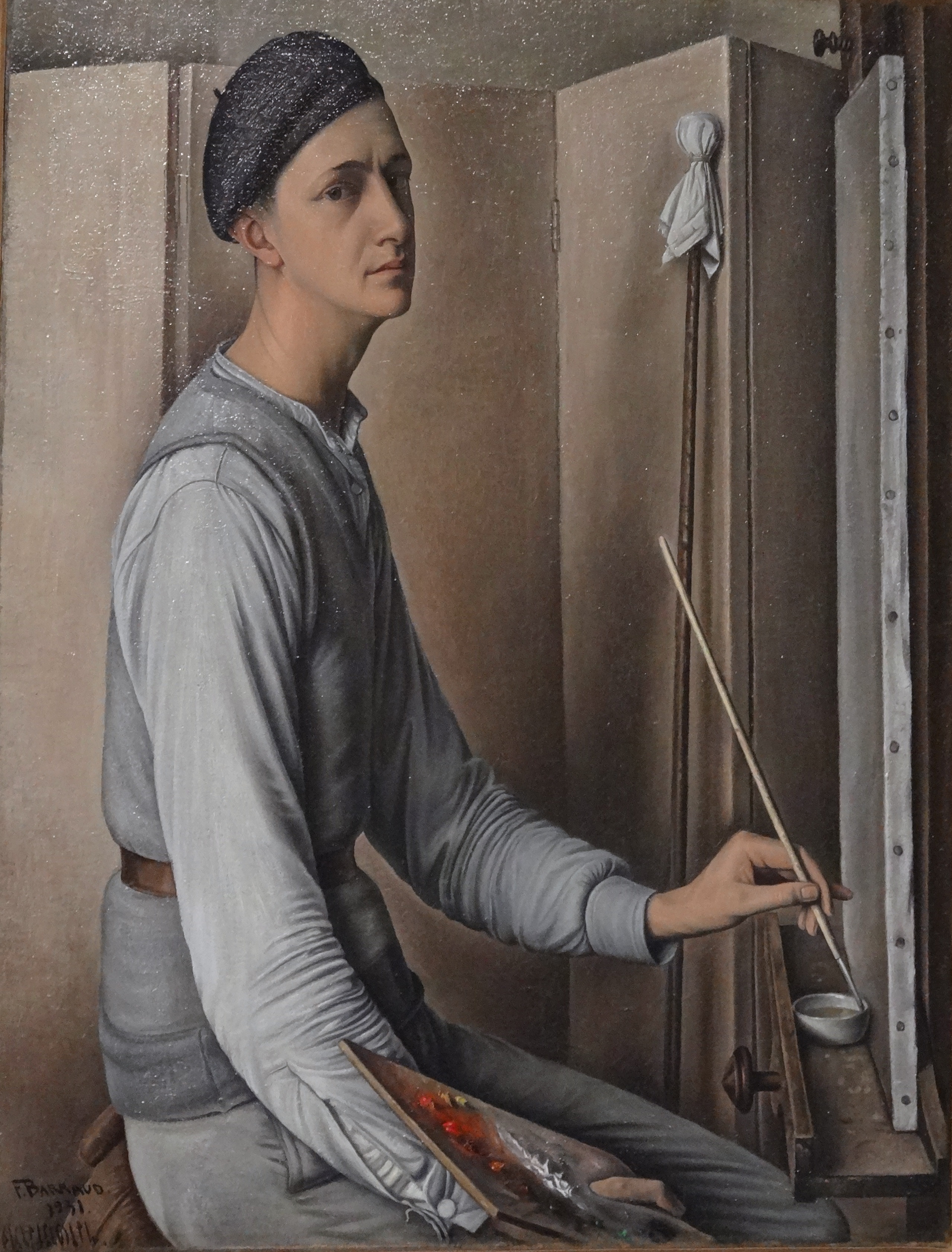
- Self-portrait, 1931
- Born: François-Emile Barraud; 24 November 1899; La Chaux-de-Fonds, Switzerland
- Died: 11 September 1934 (aged 34); Geneva, Switzerland
- Known for: Painting

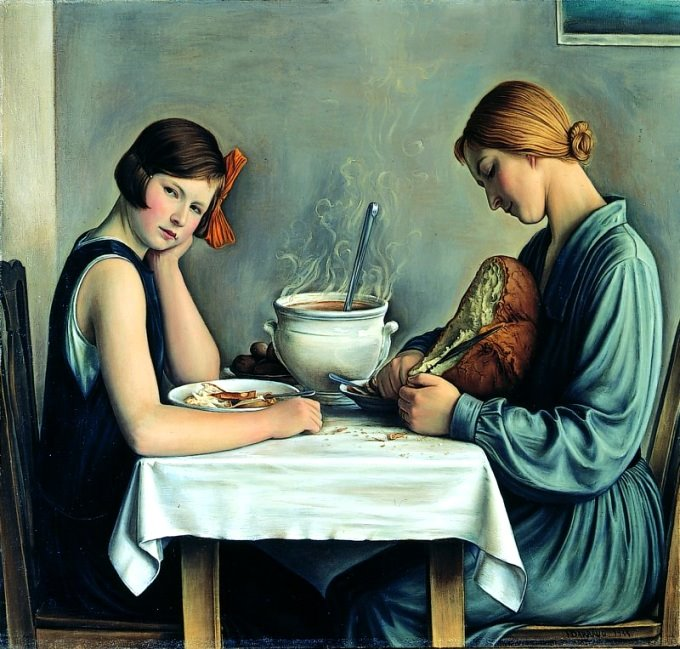
La Tailleuse de Soupe, 1933, Oil on canvas

François Barraud (24 November 1899 – 11 September 1934) was a Swiss painter.

Barraud was the second eldest of four brothers who all painted or sculpted at various points in their lives. The brothers, François, Aimé, Aurèle and Charles, were largely self-taught artists having been raised as professional plasterers and house painters. Barraud attended evening classes at the local art school in 1911 together with his brothers. In 1919, he exhibited his paintings in La Chaux-de-Fonds and participated in the National Exhibition of Fine Arts in Basel. Encouraged by the success of the exhibitions he left Switzerland in 1922, and moved to Reims in France where he worked as a house painter for two years. He married Marie, a French woman, in 1924. Marie subsequently featured as a model in several of his paintings. Around 1924 or 1925, Barraud found work in Paris as an artist and craftsman. While living in Paris he studied painting at the École du Louvre.

François Barraud painted mainly still lifes, female nudes and portraits, including several double portraits of himself and his wife, Marie His precise, realist style of painting developed under the influence of the old Flemish and French masters he had studied at the Louvre.

Barraud suffered periods of illness throughout his life and died of tuberculosis in Geneva, in 1934, at the age of 34.

Arthur Stoll held a major collection of François Barraud's works. His works are also held in the Musée des beaux-arts in La Chaux-de-Fonds, the Coninx Museum in Zurich and the Foundation for Art, Culture and History in Winterthur.

== See also ==
- Aimé Barraud
- Charles Barraud
