= Aimé Barraud =

Swiss artist (1902–1954)

Aimé Barraud (1902–1954) was a Swiss painter, remembered as part of the Neue Sachlichkeit (New Objectivity) movement which emerged after the First World War.

== Biography ==
The seven recorded children of the Barraud family (six sons and a daughter) were born at La Chaux-de-Fonds in the canton of Neuchâtel at the turn of the twentieth century. Aimé was born on 14 March 1902.

Craft-based work was at the centre of family life. Barraud's parents, as well as his maternal grandfather, specialised in engraving, creating decorations for the metal housings of pocket watches. (Watchmaking was, and has remained, a mainstay of the local economy.) A high level of precision in their decorative engraving was important to the family, and at an early age the sons attended evening classes at the local specialist school of applied craftsmanship.

When he turned to painting, Aimé Barraud restricted himself to a narrow range of subjects, concentrating on portraits, including self-portraits and portraits of himself with his wife. There were also nudes, still lifes and empty landscapes. Applying precision and clear uncomplicated colours he achieved a high level of realism.

Aimé Barraud died on 14 February 1954 at Neuchâtel, the cantonal capital.

== See also ==
- Charles Barraud
- François Barraud
