= Gramophone Company =

British phonograph manufacturer and record label

The Gramophone Company Limited
- A Gramophone Company record, with the His Master's Voice and Recording Angel trademarks
- Industry: Phonograph manufacturer and record label
- Founded: April 1898; 128 years ago
- Defunct: July 1973; 53 years ago
- Headquarters: London, England
- Owner: Independent (1898–1931); EMI (1931–1973)
- Subsidiaries: His Master's Voice (1909–1973); Deutsche Grammophon (1900–1914); Gramophone Company India (1901–1973); La voce del padrone (1904-1967); La Voix de son maître (1901–1949); Electrola (1925–1931); Harvest Records (1969–1973); La Voz de su Amo (Spain)

The Gramophone Company Limited was a British phonograph manufacturer and record label, founded in April 1898 by Emil Berliner. It was one of the earliest record labels.

In 1899, the Gramophone Company purchased the His Master's Voice painting and trademark rights. The company replaced its "Recording Angel" trademark with a rendering of the His Master's Voice painting on its record labels in 1909. The prominence of the phrase "His Master's Voice" on the top perimeter of the labels led to the company and its records being referred to (unofficially) as "His Master's Voice". Beginning in 1902, the Gramophone Company began a 55 year affiliation with the American Victor Talking Machine Company (later, RCA Victor), which held the rights to the His Master's Voice trademark in the Western Hemisphere.

In 1931, The Gramophone Company and the Columbia Graphophone Company merged to form Electric and Musical Industries Limited (EMI). The Gramophone Company continued as one of EMI's music labels until 1973, when its legal entity was changed to EMI Records Limited. The His Master's Voice label continued until 1993, when it was replaced by EMI Classics.

== History ==
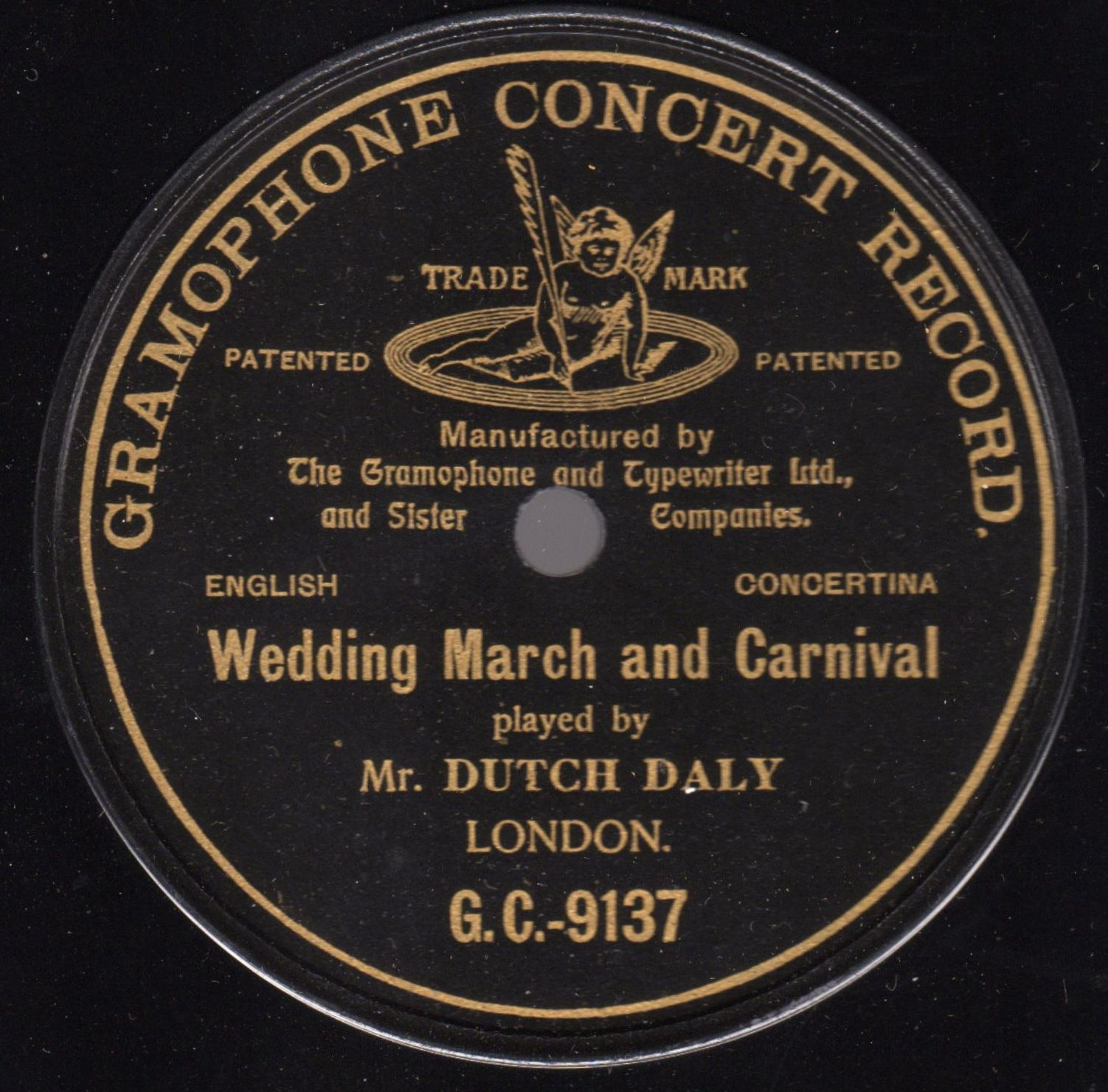
A Gramophone Company label with the original "Recording Angel" trademark, prior to the use of the His Master's Voice.

The Gramophone Company was founded in April 1898 by William Barry Owen and Edmund Trevor Lloyd Wynne Williams, commissioned by Emil Berliner, in London.

Owen was acting as agent for Emile Berliner, inventor of the gramophone record, whilst Williams provided the finances. Most of the company's early discs were made in Hanover, Germany at a plant operated by members of Berliner's family, though it had operations around the world.

In 1898, Fred Gaisberg moved from the U.S. to London to set up the first disc recording studio in Europe; it was situated in Maiden Lane. Among early artists he recorded was Syria Lamont, an Australian soprano whose single "Coming through the Rye" was one of the first ever issued. In December 1900, Owen gained the manufacturing rights for the Lambert Typewriter Company, and the Gramophone Company was for a few years renamed the Gramophone & Typewriter Ltd. This was an attempt to diversify the business model, in response to a series of lawsuits by Edison Bell.

=== Lawsuits ===
The Berliner Gramophone Company was hit the hardest with a lawsuit that involved a former employee, Frank Seaman. Berliner had hired Seaman, part of The National Gramophone Company, to handle the distribution of record players and disk as an exclusive sales agent. In secret, he started producing a product inferior to the Gramophone, which he called the Zonophone and began solely marketing that instead of the gramophone. Berliner cancelled his contract with The National Gramophone Company, and in turn was sued for breach of contract.

In 1900, the U.S. parent of Gramophone lost a patent infringement suit brought on by Columbia Records and Zonophone, and was no longer permitted to produce records in the U.S.

The agreement allowed Columbia to produce disc records themselves in the United States, which they began doing in 1901, with the UK Gramophone Company and others continuing to do so outside of the US. Emile Berliner established Berliner Gramophone in Montreal, where he became Victor's Canadian distributor and held the rights in Canada to the "His Master's Voice" trademark.

=== His Master's Voice ===
While the general public in the UK came to refer to the records and company as "His Master's Voice" because of the prominence of the phrase on the record labels, The Gramophone Company was never officially incorporated as His Master's Voice. The painting "His Master's Voice" was made in the 1890s with the dog Nipper listening to an Edison cylinder phonograph.

In 1899, Owen bought the painting from Francis Barraud, the artist, and asked him to paint out the Edison machine and substitute a Gramophone, which he did. In 1900, Emile Berliner acquired the US rights to the painting and it became the trademark of the Victor Talking Machine Company in 1901; the UK rights were retained by the Gramophone Company. Victor utilized the Nipper trademark far more aggressively than the Gramophone Company, first using it on their record labels in 1902.

In February 1909, the Gramophone Company introduced new labels featuring the famous trademark known as "His Master's Voice", generally referred to in the UK as HMV, to distinguish them from earlier labels which featured the Recording Angel trademark. The latter had been designed by Theodore Birnbaum, an executive of the Gramophone Company pressing plant in Hanover, Germany.

=== Recording studios ===
In the mid-1920s, company chairman Trevor Osmond Williams approved funding for the company to secure property and build a recording studio, putting F. H. Dart from the company's technical recording department in charge of the project. Number 3 Abbey Road was acquired in 1929 and, after nearly 2 years of extensive renovations, the 3-studio facility that would come to be known as EMI Recording Studios (and eventually Abbey Road Studios) opened on 12 November 1931.

=== Formation of EMI ===
In March 1931, The Gramophone Company merged with the English Columbia Graphophone Company to form Electric and Musical Industries Ltd (EMI). The "Gramophone Company, Ltd." name, however, continued to be used for many decades, especially for copyright purposes.

From the 1930s onwards, HMV manufactured radio and television sets and radiograms under the HMV and Marconiphone brand names in its factory in Hayes, Middlesex.

Gramophone Company of India was formed in 1946. The Gramophone Company Ltd legal entity was renamed EMI Records Ltd. in 1973. After EMI was acquired by Universal Music, the company was renamed Parlophone Records Ltd. and absorbed by Warner Music.

== Acoustic recordings ==
From the 1890s to mid-1925, recordings were made without any electrical equipment, relying instead upon the energy inherent in the sound waves generated by the performers, to activate the recording apparatus.

Matrix number	Catalog number	Year recorded	Year reviewed	Composer	Work	Artist(s)	Notes
05672; Cc 344-1	D 576	1921		Bach	Prelude & Fugue No. 3 in C-Sharp Major, BWV 848	Scharrer, Irene	
3-0826 cc1935 III; 3-0827 cc1936 II; 3-0828 cc1937 II	D 683,4	1922-10-05	1923	Bach	Brandenburg Concerto no. 3, BWV 1048, G major	Goossens, Eugène; Royal Albert Hall Orchestra	
2-07920 A15560; 2-07918 A15561; 2-01922 A15562	DB 587; DB 588	1915		Bach	Concerto for two violins, BWV 1043, D minor	Zimbalist, Efrem (violin), Kreisler, Fritz, 1875-1962 (violin), String Quartet (orchestra)	
Cc 1299-1. Cc 2909-1. Cc 2910-4. Cc 2911-4. Cc 2912-4. Cc 2913-3. Cc 2914-4	D 947-950	1923-06-18		Beethoven	Quartet No. 1 in F major, Op. 18, No. 1	Catterall Quartet	https://sounds.bl.uk/Classical-music/Beethoven/026M-1CL0072526XX-0100V0
Cc 3119; Cc 3120; Cc 4545; Cc 4546; Cc 4547; Cc4548	D 997-999	1924-05-06		Beethoven	Quartet No. 2 in F major, Op. 18, No. 1	Catterall Quartet	https://sounds.bl.uk/Classical-music/Beethoven/026M-1CL0029893XX-0100V0
Cc4550, Cc4614 through Cc4617, and Cc4690 through Cc4692	HMV D 953 through D 956	1924-06		Beethoven	Quartet No. 8 in E minor, Op. 59, No. 2 ("Rasumovsky")	Virtuoso String Quartet: Marjorie Hayward, violin I Edwin Virgo, violin II Raymond Jeremy, viola Cedric Sharpe. cello	
HO2732af		1917-07		Beethoven	Trio, piano, strings, op.1. no.2 (presto)	Hambourg, Mark, 1879-1960 (piano), Hayward, Marjorie, 1885-1953 (violin), Warwick-Evans, C (cello)	
3-07975 cc3392 I; 3-07976 cc3398 II; 3-07977 cc3399 II; 3-07978 cc3400 III; 3-07979 cc3401 II; 3-07980 cc3406 II; 3-07981 cc3407 II; 3-07982 cc3408 III; 3-07983 cc3413 II; 3-07984 cc3414 II	D 767; D768; D769; D770; D771	1923-09		Beethoven	Violin Concerto op 61, D major	Menges, Isolde (violin), Royal Albert Hall Orchestra (orchestra); Ronald, Sir Landon	
05694 cc1182 I; 05695 cc1183 I; 05696 cc1184 III; 05697 cc1185 IV; 05698 cc1186 II; 05699 cc1187 I; 05700 cc1188 II; 05701 cc1189 IV; 05702 cc1190 III; 05703 cc1191 II	D 625; D 626; D 627; D 628; D 629	1922-04		Beethoven	Piano Concerto 5, op 73, E flat major	Lamond, Frederic (piano), Royal Albert Hall Orchestra (orchestra); Goossens, Eugène	
3-0798 cc1812 IV; 3-0799 cc1813 III; 3-0800 cc1814 IV; 3-0801 cc1815 I; 3-0802 cc1948 II; 3-0803 cc1949 I; 3-0804 cc2017 I; 3-0805 cc1950 II	D 665; D 666; D 667; D 668	1922-09-12		Beethoven	Symphony no. 5, op 67, C minor	Royal Albert Hall Orchestra; Ronald, Sir Landon	
4-0511 cc3655 III; 4-0512 cc3696 IV; 4-0513 cc3704 I; 4-0514 cc3705 II; 4-0515 cc3706 III; 4-0516 cc3707 III; 4-0517 cc3708; 4-0518 cc3735; 4-0519 cc3736 I; 4-0520 cc3737; 4-0521 cc3738 III; 4-0522 cc3813 II; 4-0528 cc3814 II; 4-0524 cc3815 III; 4-0525 cc3816 II; 4-0526 cc3817 IV	D 842; D 843; D 844; D 845; D 846; D 847; D 848; D 849	1923-10		Beethoven	Symphony no. 9, op 125, D minor	Symphony Orchestra; Coates, Albert	
HO 2231 af	05629	1916-10		Chopin	Nocturne in C minor Op 48 No 1 abridged	Scharrer, Irene	
Bb 536-1;	E 255	1921-10		Chopin	Prelude in F sharp minor Op 28 No 8	Scharrer, Irene	
4-2781 HO_2862_ab	E 78	1914-06		Mozart	Zauberflöte: O Isis	Radford, Robert	
HO 4536-2 af [p	D 543	1920-09		Scarlatti	Sonata in G majorL387 (Kk14)	Scharrer, Irene	

== See also ==
- Lists of record labels
- HMV
- Sunrise Records
- For Your Entertainment (FYE)
- List of phonograph manufacturers
- Angel Records
- Addis v Gramophone Co Ltd [1909] UKHL 1
