= Nipper =

Dog featured on the His Master's Voice trademark

Coordinates: 51.410990°N 0.302226°W

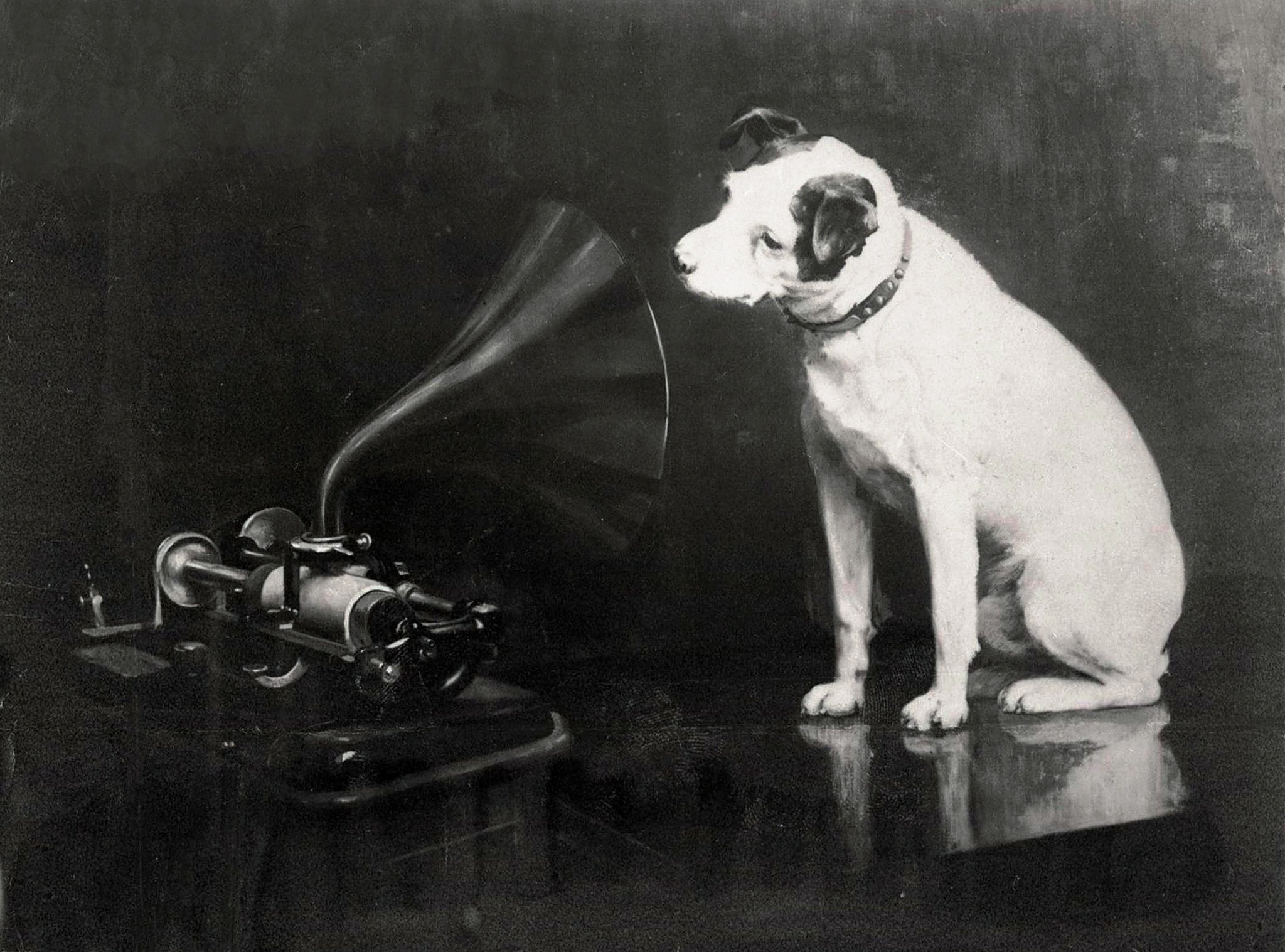
- Photo taken in 1898 or 1899 of Francis Barraud's original His Master's Voice painting (1898) depicting Nipper listening to an Edison cylinder phonograph
- Species: Canis familiaris
- Breed: Mongrel (part terrier)
- Sex: Male
- Born: 1884; Bristol, United Kingdom
- Died: September 1895 (aged 10–11); England, United Kingdom
- Resting place: Kingston upon Thames, United Kingdom
- Known for: Subject of the His Master's Voice trademark
- Owner: Mark Henry Barraud

Nipper (c. 1884 – September 1895) was a dog from England. He is best known as the subject of His Master's Voice (1898), painted posthumously by his second owner, Francis Barraud. The painting became an international entertainment trademark, with Nipper's likeness used across record labels, consumer electronics and entertainment retail.

== Life ==
Nipper was born in 1884 in Bristol, England, and died in September 1895. He was likely a mixed-breed dog, although most early sources suggest that he was a Smooth Fox Terrier, or perhaps a Jack Russell Terrier, or possibly "part Bull Terrier". He was named Nipper because he would often "nip" at the backs of visitors' legs.

Nipper originally lived with his owner, Mark Henry Barraud, in the Prince's Theatre where Barraud was a scenery designer. When Barraud died in 1887, his brothers Philip and Francis took care of the dog, then Francis took Nipper to Liverpool, and later to Mark's widow in Kingston upon Thames, London. Nipper died of natural causes in 1895 and was buried in Kingston upon Thames at Clarence Street, in a small park surrounded by magnolia trees.

== His Master's Voice ==
In 1898, three years after Nipper's death, Francis Barraud, the brother of Nipper's original owner, painted a picture of the dog listening intently to an Edison-Bell cylinder phonograph. He had recalled that Nipper had often appeared "puzzled ... to make out where the voice came from" when a phonograph was playing. Barraud worked from an old photo of Nipper. Thinking the Edison-Bell Company located in New Jersey, United States, might be interested in the painting, he offered it to James E. Hough, Edison-Bell's British representative, who promptly replied, "Dogs don't listen to phonographs".

On 31 May 1899, Barraud visited the Maiden Lane offices of The Gramophone Company to inquire about borrowing a brass horn to replace the original black horn in order to brighten up the painting. When Gramophone Company founder and manager William Barry Owen was shown the painting, he suggested that if the artist painted out the cylinder machine and replaced it with a Berliner disc gramophone, he would buy the painting. Barraud gladly obliged and the phrase "His Master's Voice", along with the painting, was sold to The Gramophone Company for £100 (equivalent to £10,627 in 2025) – half for the copyright and half for the physical painting itself. The original oil painting hung in The Gramophone Company's headquarters, and then in EMI's boardroom in Hayes, Middlesex for many years. It appears that after the image was copyrighted, two employees of the Gramophone Company, William Sinkler Darby and Theodore Bernard Birnbaum, recorded a Mutoscope in 1900 entitled 'Nipper runs amok!'. A similar looking dog was used to act as Nipper.

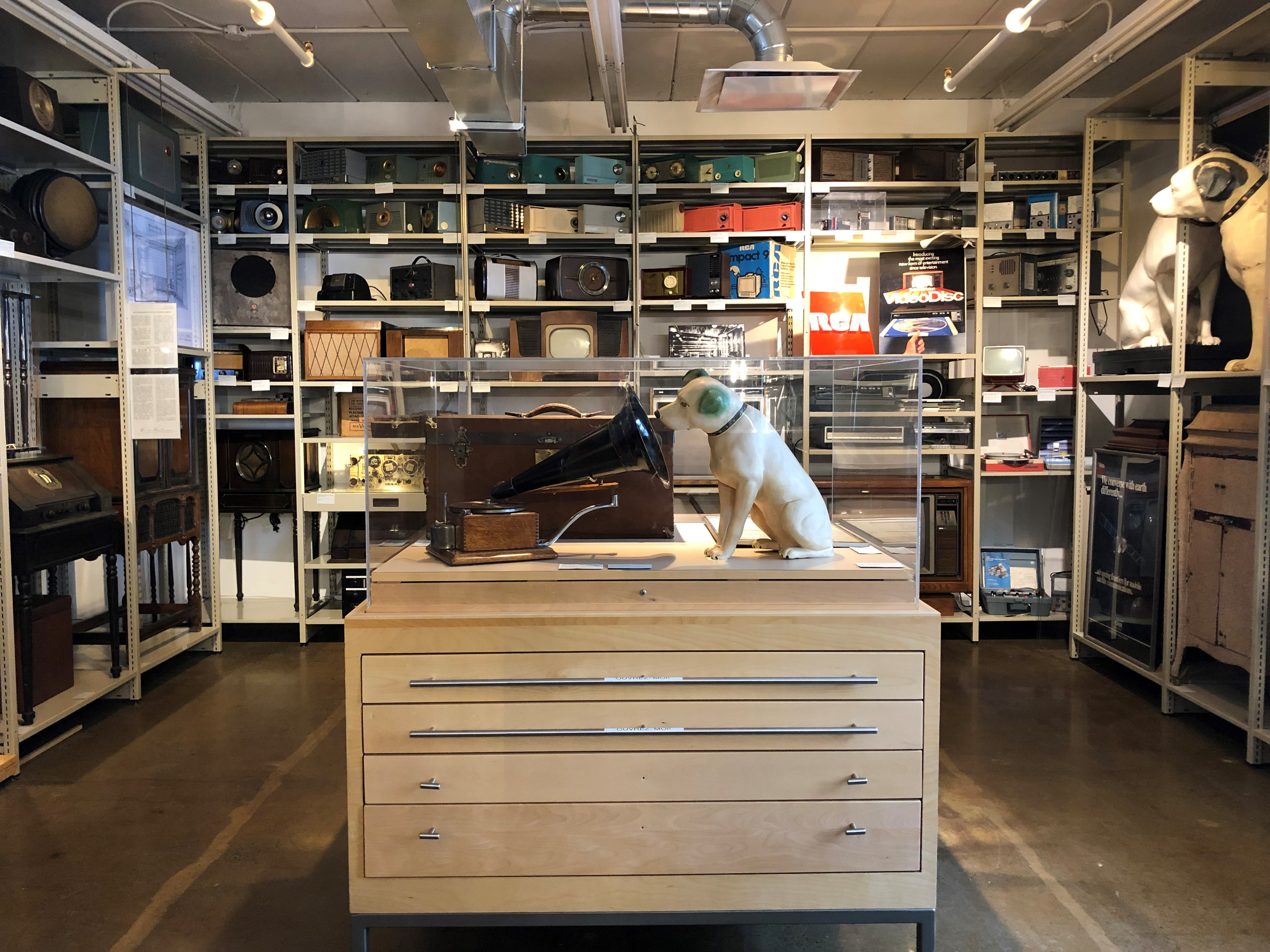
A large statue of Nipper in a glass presentation in the Musée des ondes Emile Berliner museum, in Montreal, Canada.

The Gramophone Company initially used Nipper's likeness on its gramophones but did not begin using the image on its record labels until 1909. The HMV retail shop used the trademark on its signage, beginning in 1921. Emile Berliner, creator of the disc gramophone, registered the trademark in the United States on 10 July 1900 and Berliner's business partner Eldridge Johnson began using the image in advertising for the recently created Consolidated Talking Machine Company which was reorganized in 1901 as the Victor Talking Machine Company (later RCA Victor). Johnson used Nipper and the gramophone extensively on Victor's products and advertising. The trademark was also utilized by Victor's Japanese division and remains in use by JVC.

"It is difficult to say how the idea came to me beyond the fact that it suddenly occurred to me that to have my dog listening to the phonograph, with an intelligent and rather puzzled expression, and call it 'His Master's Voice' would make an excellent subject. We had a phonograph and I often noticed how puzzled he was to make out where the voice came from. It certainly was the happiest thought I ever had."

—Francis Barraud

== Legacy ==
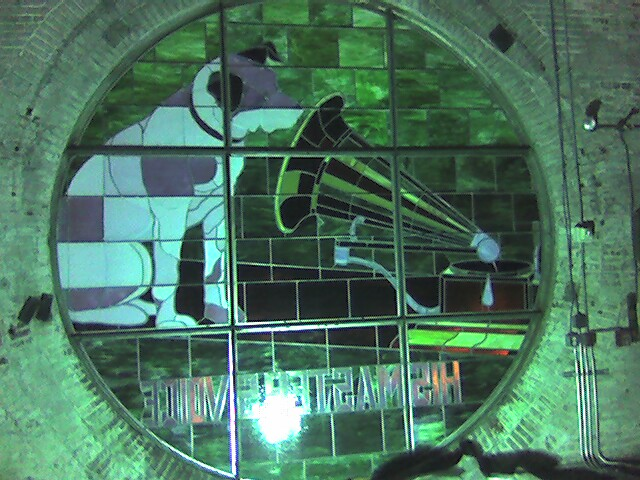
One of four stained glass windows atop the "Nipper Building", the former RCA Victor Building 17 in Camden, New Jersey. This photo, taken from inside the tower, shows the 2003 replacement of the 1979 replacement of the original 1915 glass.

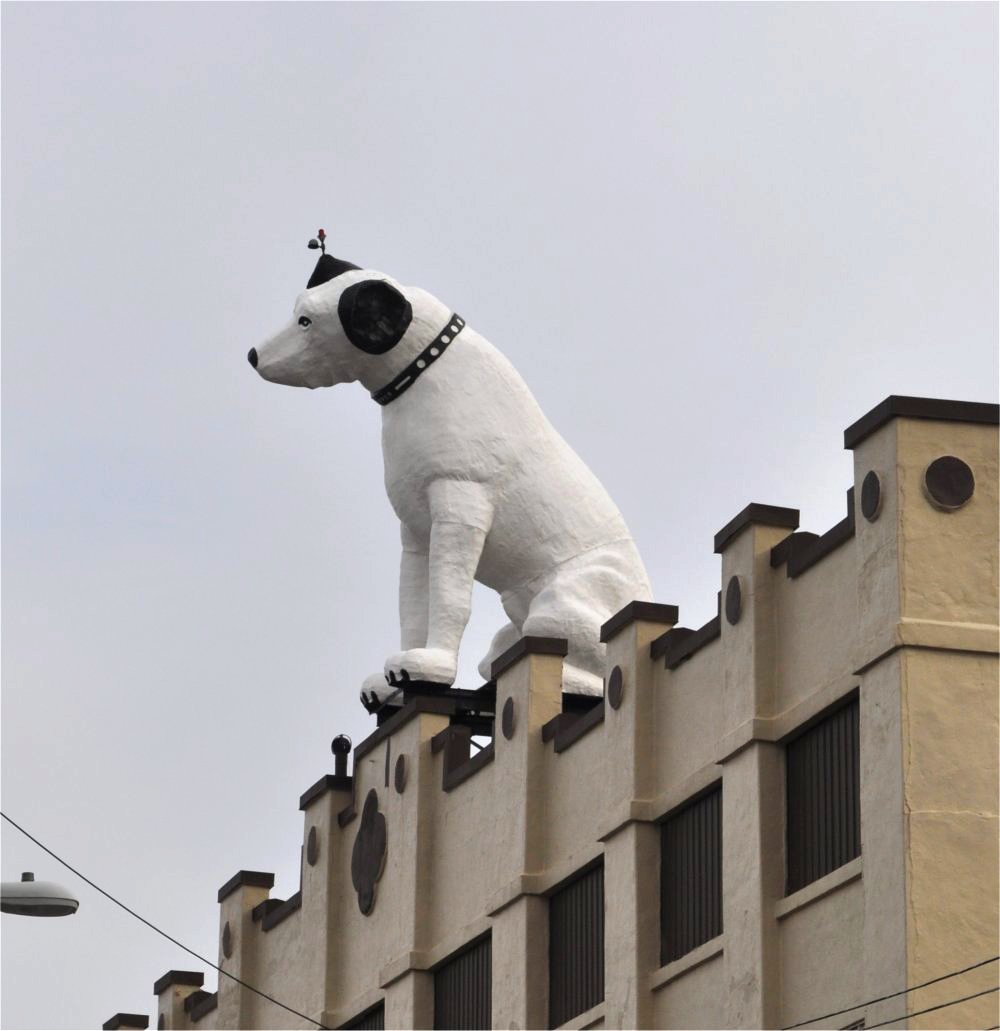
The statue of Nipper on the roof of the former RCA distribution building in Albany, New York, pictured in 2010.

As time progressed, Nipper's gravesite was built upon, and the Kingston upon Thames branch of Lloyds Bank now occupies the site. To commemorate Nipper's 100th birthday, Mr. D.F. Johnson, the then-chairman of the HMV retailer, placed a commemorative plaque to the rear of the bank on 15 August 1984, understood to be near to the resting place. An additional plaque was placed on the wall inside the entrance to the bank, referencing the one outside.

Nipper's likeness has been reproduced on a myriad of advertising and promotional items, including pocket watches, wristwatches, clocks, salt and pepper shakers, paperweights, cigar lighters, stuffed toys, coin banks, drinkware, coffee mugs, posters, calendars, beach towels, T-shirts, neckties cufflinks, belt buckles and hats. These advertising items have long been popular collectables.

In 1984, New York Times writer Hans Fantel described his early childhood impression of Nipper:

"For some who were to discover music through the phonograph in later years, Nipper's image became almost synonymous with music itself. It certainly was that way for me: I remember how, as a child, I used to keep my eyes fixed on Nipper as he spun on the turntable, and I would grow dizzy with the effort to keep the dog upright in my mind. It took me a long time to discover that, by not looking at the dog, I could hear the music without growing dizzy. But it wasn't as much fun that way. For an enchanted 3-year-old, it was Nipper - not Enrico Caruso - who addressed me in those magic tones that first opened for me the realm of music."

A depiction of Nipper appeared in RCA television advertisements, and later versions with his "son", a puppy named Chipper who was added to the RCA family in 1991. Real dogs played the roles of Nipper and Chipper, but Chipper had to be replaced much more frequently, since his character is a puppy.

A Baltimore street leading to a development of town-houses is named Nipper Way, where a statue of Nipper resided for a brief time before being relocated.

On 10 March 2010, a small road near to the dog's final resting place in Kingston upon Thames was officially named Nipper Alley.

=== Statues ===
A four-ton Nipper can be seen on the roof of the former RCA distribution building now owned by Arnoff Moving & Storage. The site is located at 991 Broadway in Albany, New York. A statue of Nipper was purchased by Jim Wells from RCA in Baltimore for $1, where it originally graced the former RCA Building on Russell Street. After spending many years on private property in Nipper Park in Merrifield, Virginia, perched over Lee Highway (U.S. Route 29), it has now been returned to Baltimore, Maryland. Nipper now sits atop the Maryland Historical Society building at Park Avenue and West Centre Street in Baltimore, and the statue now includes a gramophone. A small statue of Nipper in the United Kingdom can be seen perched above a doorway in the Merchant Venturers Building on the corner of Park Row and Woodland Road in Bristol; this building, part of the University of Bristol, stands near the site of the old Prince's Theatre.

At Walt Disney World in Florida, a replication of Nipper with a gramophone appeared inside of a spaceship on the Space Mountain rollercoaster, and remained until the sponsorship from RCA to Walt Disney ended, upon which he was made into a robot dog and moved elsewhere within the queue.

Various reproductions of Nipper can be found in the permanent exhibition of the Musée des ondes Emile Berliner in Montreal, Quebec, a museum dedicated to the work of Emile Berliner and his companies that Nipper was the mascot of.

In May 2017, the City of Albany held a contest for various groups or artists to submit designs for creative, painted Nipper statues which were placed throughout the city. Ten of the contestants were chosen to create ten Nipper statues – which were displayed for one year and then auctioned off for charity.

== See also ==
- List of individual dogs
