= His Master's Voice =

Entertainment trademark

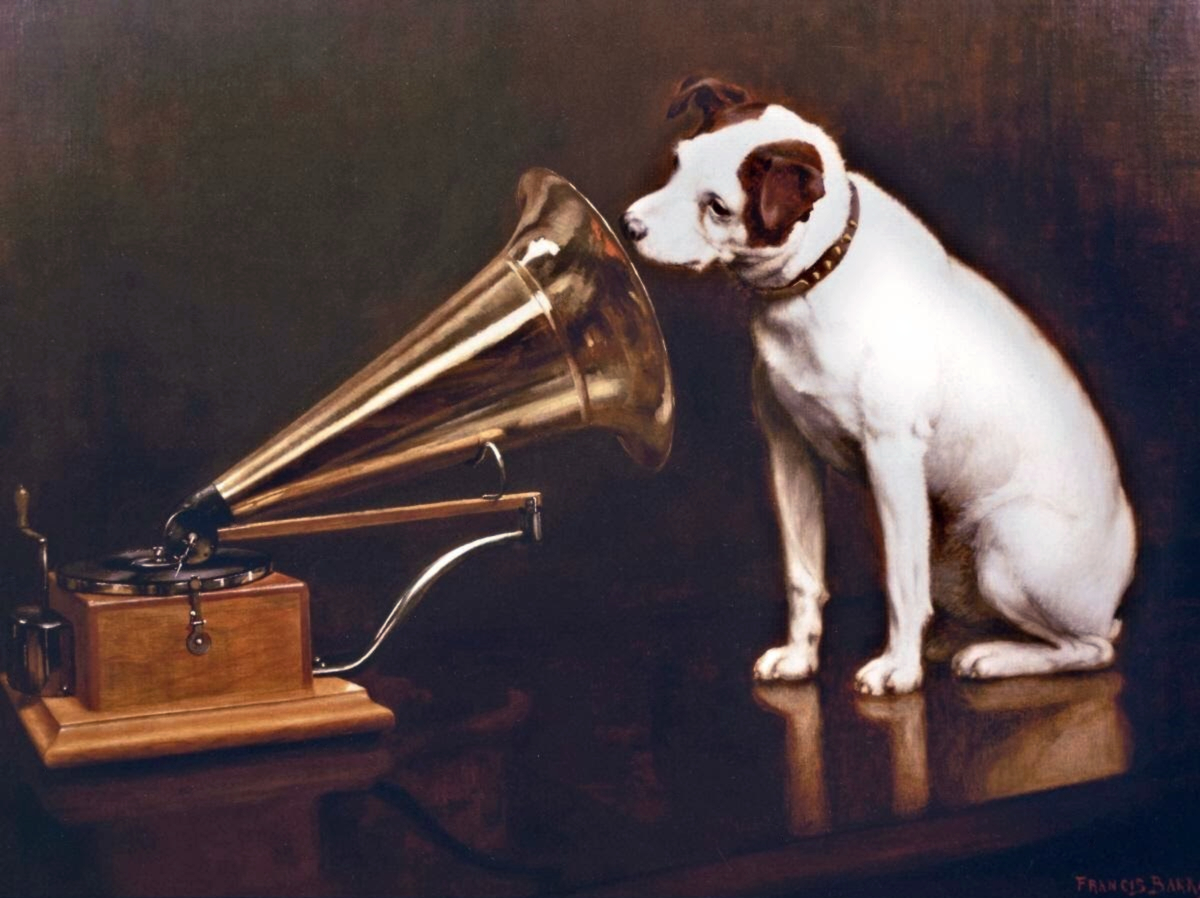
- His Master's Voice (1898) by Francis Barraud, amended in 1899 to display a gramophone.
- Owner: Mermaid (Brands) Limited (United Kingdom, Australia, Brunei, European Union, Iceland, Israel, Kenya, Namibia, Norway, Switzerland, Sudan and New Zealand); Talisman Brands, Inc. (United States, Argentina, Brazil, Bolivia, Canada, Chile, Cuba, Indonesia, Mexico, Paraguay, Peru, South Korea, Uruguay, Venezuela and Vietnam); JVCKenwood Corporation (Japan); HMV Brand Pte. Ltd. (Singapore, China, Malaysia, Taiwan and Thailand); Palm Green Capital Limited (British Virgin Islands, Albania, Bahrain, Estonia, India, Jordan, Kyrgyzstan, Mexico, Moldova, Montenegro, North Macedonia, Oman, Serbia, Tonga, Trinidad and Tobago, Turkey, United Arab Emirates and Ukraine)

His Master's Voice is an entertainment trademark featuring a dog named Nipper, looking into the horn of a wind-up gramophone. Painted by Francis Barraud in 1898, the image has since become a symbol used internationally across record labels, consumer electronics, and entertainment retail.

The original His Master's Voice painting, alongside a number of duplicates painted by Barraud, are owned by the EMI Archive Trust, based in Hayes, London.

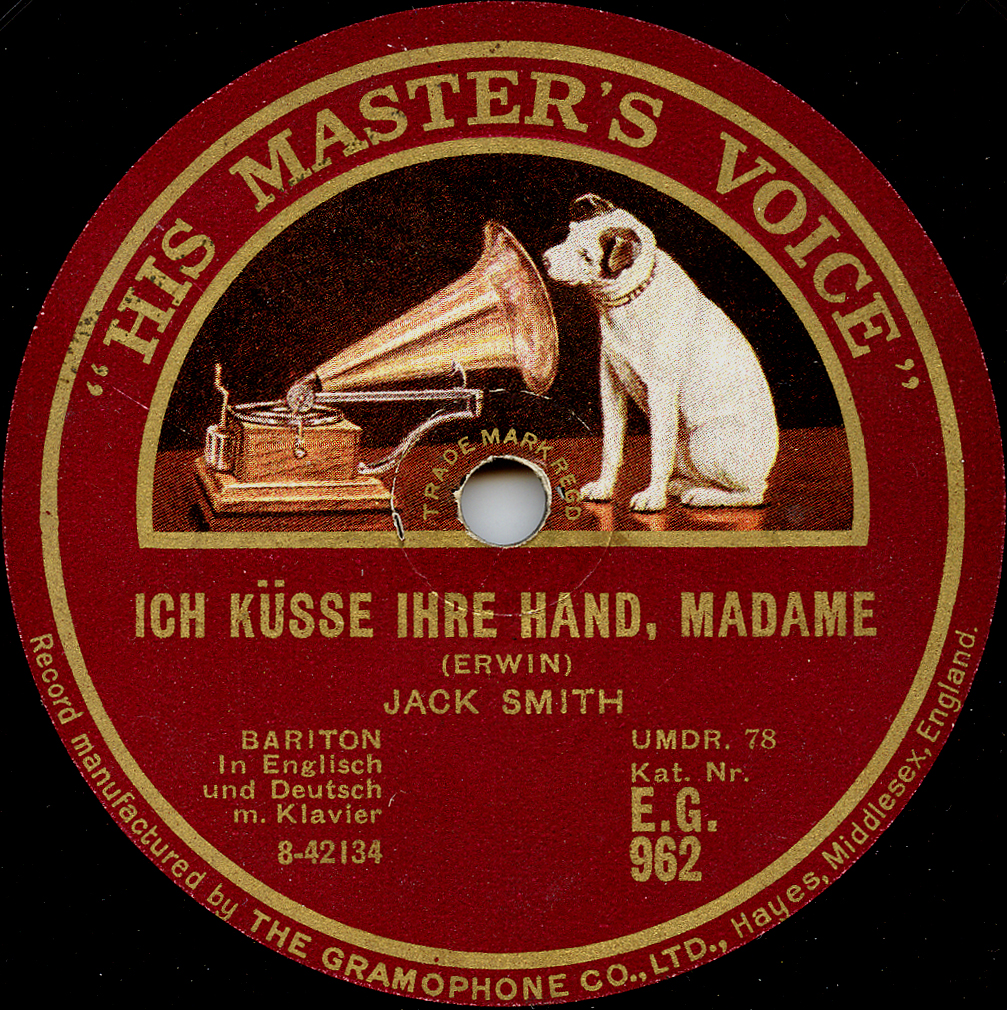
The His Master's Voice trademark has appeared on many record labels, such as this 1928 Whispering Jack Smith release from The Gramophone Company in the United Kingdom.

== History ==
=== The Gramophone Company / EMI / HMV (United Kingdom–based) ===
In early 1899, Francis Barraud applied for copyright of his original 1898 painting using the descriptive working title Dog looking at and listening to a Phonograph. He was unable to sell the work to any cylinder phonograph company. The painting had been originally offered to James Hough, manager of Edison Bell in London, but he declined, saying "dogs don't listen to phonographs".

William Barry Owen, the American founder of the Gramophone Company in England, offered to purchase the painting for £100, under the condition that Barraud modify the cylinder phonograph to show one of their disc machines. Barraud complied and the image was first used on the company's catalogue from December 1899. The company also began using the imagery on its gramophones. As the trademark gained in popularity, several additional paintings were subsequently commissioned from Barraud for various corporate purposes.

In 1909, The Gramophone Company began using the dog and gramophone trademark on its record labels, replacing the former "recording Angel" trademark. The company rapidly became known as His Master's Voice due to the prominence of that phrase around the top perimeter of the label. The Gramophone Company (HMV) distributed its recordings throughout Europe and later established dedicated international divisions in several countries. In regions without these divisions, such as Scandinavia and Greece, the British HMV company exported its releases.

The Gramophone Company's French and Italian subsidiaries translated the phrase "His Master's Voice" to "La Voix de son maître" and "La voce del padrone" on their record labels in their respective countries.

In 1921, The Gramophone Company launched the His Master's Voice retail shop on Oxford Street. Additional shops appeared, turning His Master's Voice into a large music retail chain.

In 1925 and 1926, The Gramophone Company created record label divisions in Australia and New Zealand respectively. Through sales and mergers, the Gramophone Company became part of EMI in 1931.

Deutsche Grammophon Gesellschaft, was the Gramophone Company's German subsidiary until seceding from the parent company in 1914, as a result of the hostilities between Germany and Great Britain during the First World War. DGG retained the "His Master's Voice" trademark for use in Germany until 1949. The trademark was then adopted by Electrola, the Gramophone Company's German affiliate formed in 1925, to replace the renegade DGG.

From the mid-1980s, EMI began to open international HMV retail outlets, but were unable to use the "His Master's Voice" trademark in the United States, Canada or Japan. However, EMI's use of just the "HMV" initials in these regions was permitted.

In 1985, EMI sold the Gramophone Company's branch in India (formed in 1901) to RP-Sanjiv Goenka Group; however the "His Master's Voice" trademark would continue to be used in India under license from EMI, until 2003.

In 1990, EMI began to phase out the His Master's Voice record label, gradually replacing it with the EMI Classics label in 1993. In 1998, it divested the HMV retailer, which became an independent company, HMV Media Group plc. However, EMI held onto the "His Master's Voice" trademark, licensing the name to the retailer, and continuing it for its only remaining license in India.

In June 2003, the formal "His Master's Voice" trademark transfer took place from EMI Records to HMV Media Group plc. This meant that EMI's only remaining license agreement, the His Master's Voice record label in India, would be discontinued, and record releases in this region would be renamed to Saregama from 2003 onwards.

In January 2013, HMV Group plc would later be rescued by Hilco Capital, who retained the "His Master's Voice" trademark rights in a number of continents under the name "Mermaid (Brands) Limited" when they sold the HMV stores to Sunrise Records. The rightsholders in some territories is Palm Green Capital Limited, a company based in British Virgin Islands, instead of Hilco Capital.

In February 2013, HMV Group plc sold the HMV stores in Hong Kong and Singapore to AID Partners Capital Limited, with the sale including full ownership of the "His Master's Voice" and "HMV" intellectual property for a select number of Asian countries. The His Master's Voice intellectual property in these regions has since passed to a company called HMV Brand Pte. Ltd.

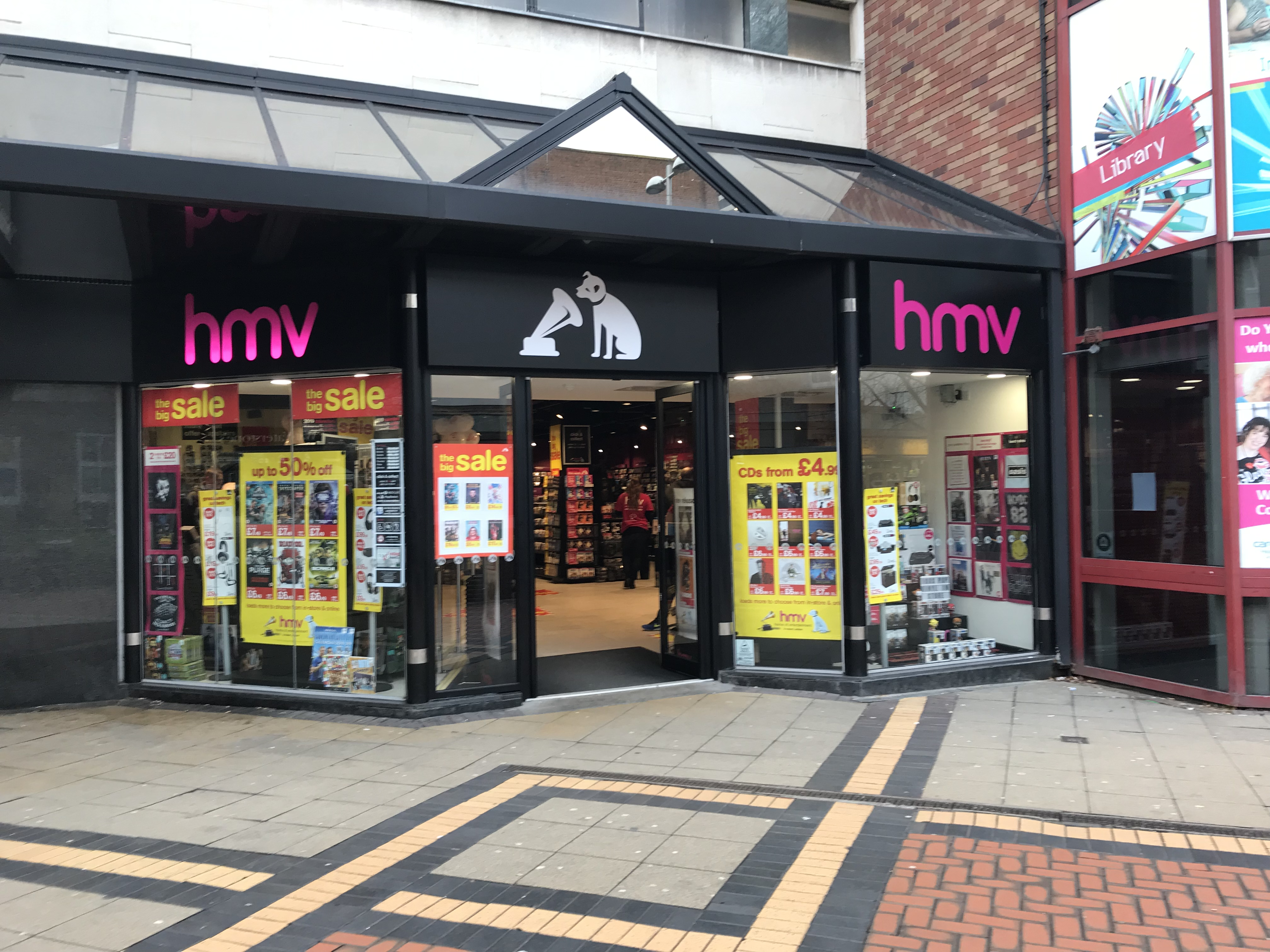
Following EMI's retirement of the British His Master's Voice record label in 1993, the trademark then became best known in the United Kingdom as the logo for the HMV entertainment retailer.

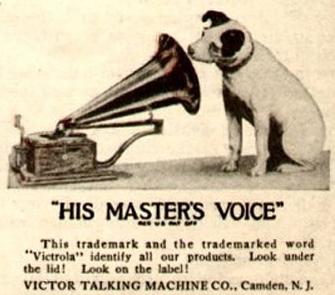
The Victor Talking Machine Company in the United States used the His Master's Voice trademark from 1901 onwards. The above example is an advertisement from 1921.

=== Victor Talking Machine Company / RCA Victor (United States–based) ===
Emile Berliner, the inventor of the gramophone, had seen the "His Master's Voice" painting at the Gramophone Company's offices in London and registered it as a trademark in the United States during July 1900.

In the autumn of 1900, the "His Master's Voice" trademark first appeared in the United States in advertisements for the Consolidated Talking Machine Company, formed by Eldridge R. Johnson and reorganized in 1901 as the Victor Talking Machine Company in Camden, New Jersey. Victor was the American affiliate of British Gramophone Company and initially used the trademark more extensively on its products and in advertising than its affiliate in England.

In 1929, the Radio Corporation of America (RCA) purchased the Victor Talking Machine Company, which became the RCA Victor Division and expanded the use of the trademark on radios, television sets and other electronics and accessories. Beginning in the 1950s, RCA would gradually phase out the trademark's use on consumer electronics, in lieu of the RCA "lightning bolt" logo.

In 1968, RCA introduced a modern logo and virtually retired the His Master's Voice trademark, restricting its use only to the album covers of RCA Red Seal Records. In October 1976, RCA announced a revival of the His Master's Voice trademark, restoring it to most RCA record labels, advertising, and other products in the Western Hemisphere. In 1986, following the acquisition of the RCA Corporation by General Electric, RCA Records was purchased by German media conglomerate Bertelsmann in early 1987. The "His Master's Voice" trademark continued to be widely used in the US and other territories where RCA previously held the rights until the early 2000s, when its use was again limited due to the worldwide fragmented ownership of the trademark.

General Electric eventually sold the rights to the "RCA" and "His Master's Voice" trademarks to Technicolor SA. In 2008, Bertelsmann sold RCA Records to Sony Music Entertainment, which continues to use the "RCA", "RCA Victor" and "His Master's Voice" trademarks under perpetual license.

In May 2022, the RCA and "His Master's Voice" trademarks were acquired by Talisman Brands Inc. Since 2023, Talisman Brands has licensed the "His Master's Voice" trademark to a company called Victor Musical Industries Inc, which produces "His Master's Voice"-branded consumer electronics and apparel.

==== JVC / Victor Entertainment / JVCKenwood (Japan-based) ====
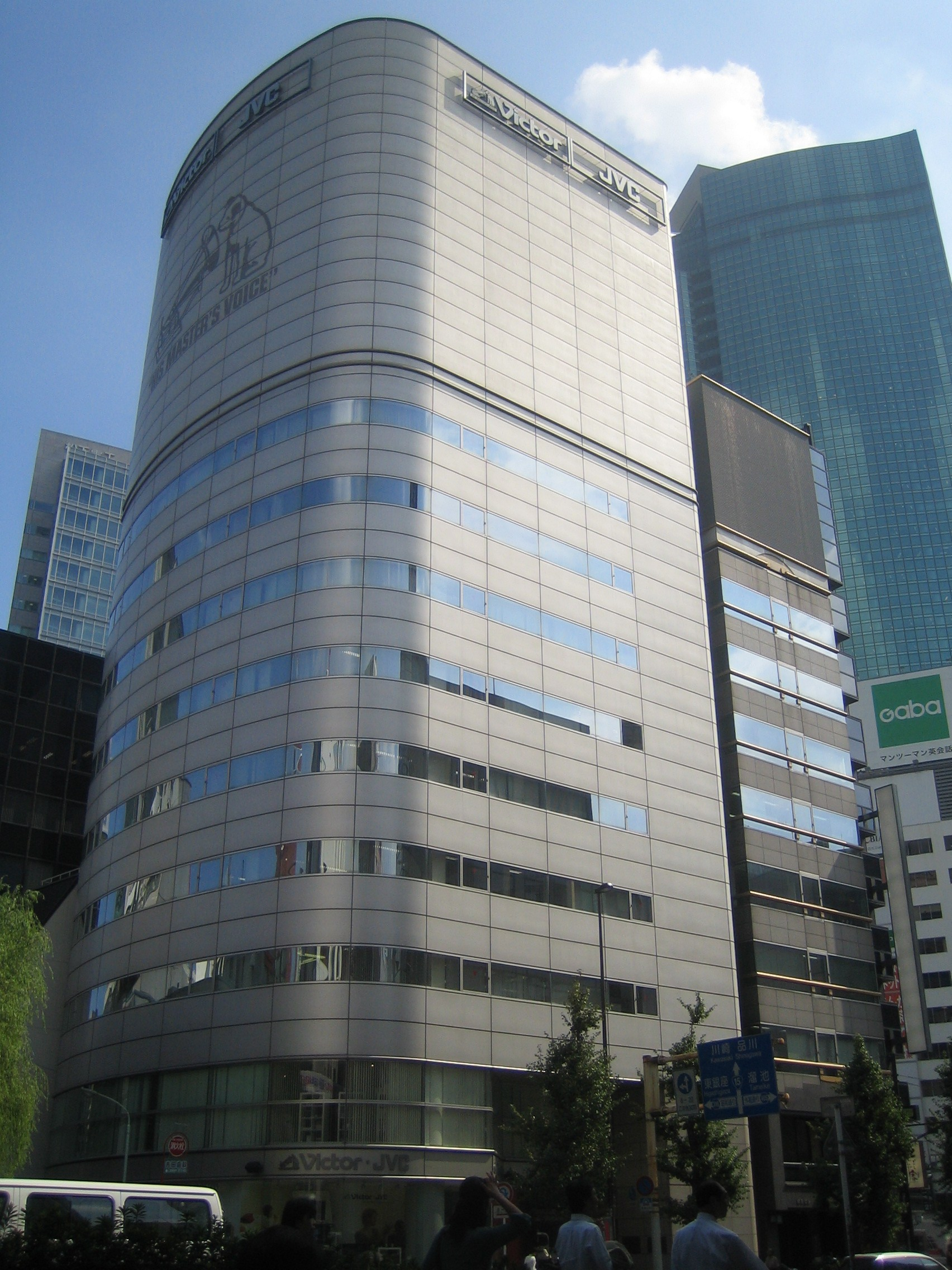
The "His Master's Voice" trademark appears on the JVC-Victor offices in Shinbashi, Japan. Pictured in September 2007

In 1927, the Victor Talking Machine Company of Japan was created, which brought the "His Master's Voice" trademark to Japan, and later became known as JVC, the Japan Victor Company. The company used "His Master's Voice" across a wide range of consumer electronics.

In 1943, JVC seceded from RCA Victor due to the hostilities between Japan and the United States during World War II. The Japanese division became an independent company, retaining the Victor name and "His Master's Voice" trademarks for use in Japan.

In 1972, JVC created Victor Musical Industries, a distributor of music and film, which uses the "His Master's Voice" logo. Victor Musical Industries has since been renamed Victor Entertainment, and the "His Master's Voice" logo remains retained.

In 1990, EMI launched the HMV retailer in Japan. However, it was unable to use the Nipper/"His Master's Voice" trademark due to JVC controlling its use in that country. However, they were not contested to use just the initials "HMV".

In October 2008, JVC and the Kenwood Corporation created a joint-venture, JVCKenwood, to create consumer electronics. This venture uses the "His Master's Voice" logo, mainly on audio equipment.

== Legal disputes ==
=== HMV Brand Pte. Ltd. vs. Talisman Brands, Inc. (2021) ===
In July 2021, HMV Brand Pte. Ltd. made a revocation application against Talisman Brands, Inc. over a His Master's Voice trademark in Hong Kong that had been registered in 1995. HMV Brand Pte. Ltd. argued that the mark had not been genuinely used. The Registrar found that the evidence established genuine use of the trade mark in Hong Kong in relation to audio recordings, specifically CD albums and digital sound recordings, during the period from 2010 to 2021. This use was considered sufficient to support the continued registration of the mark for those goods. However, the Registrar found no evidence of use in relation to other goods covered by the Class 9 specification, including scientific, nautical, and electrical apparatus. The Registrar ordered a partial revocation of the trade mark registration.

=== Yongfeng Trade Co. Ltd. vs. Mermaid (Brands) Limited (2022) ===
In November 2020, Yongfeng Trade Co. Ltd. filed an application seeking removal of Mermaid (Brands) Limited's "His Master's Voice" trademark from the Australia register for non-use. In January 2021, Mermaid filed a notice of intention to oppose the removal of the trademark. In October 2022, the decisionmakers ruled in favour of Mermaid, who were able to demonstrate the previous appointment of a brand licensing agency in Australia, as well as potential plans to revive the HMV retailer in Australia using the His Master's Voice logo, alongside plans to produce His Master's Voice branded merchandise and products.

=== HMV Brand Pte. Ltd. vs. Yongfeng Trade Co. Ltd. (2023) ===
In July 2019, Yongfeng Trade Co. Ltd. applied to register a nearly identical image of the His Master's Voice logo in Classes 9 and 25 (electronics and clothing). Initially, The Registar rejected Yongfeng's application because of HMV Brand Pte's earlier marks. Because HMV Brand Pte. Ltd. was in financial trouble and did not defend the case, they lost protection in Classes 9 and 25. Once those marks were revoked, Yongfeng successfully registered its own look-alike mark in 2020. HMV Brand Pte. Ltd. still had valid registrations in other classes, and it planned to revive the brand in Singapore. In April 2023, HMV Brand Pte. Ltd. successfully applied to invalidate Yongfeng's registration, arguing it was filed in bad faith.

== In popular culture ==
The design was parodied on the original cover of the album Miaow by The Beautiful South, which features a painting by Michael Sowa, showing a theatre with a dog on each seat, and a gramophone on stage. It was withdrawn at EMI's insistence.
