= William Barraud =

English animal painter and illustrator

- Born: 1810; Lambeth, London
- Died: 1 October 1850 (aged 39–40); Kensington, London
- Occupations: Painter, illustrator
- Spouse(s): Mary Ratliff; Margaret Harrison.
- Children: 1
- Relatives: Henry Barraud (brother)

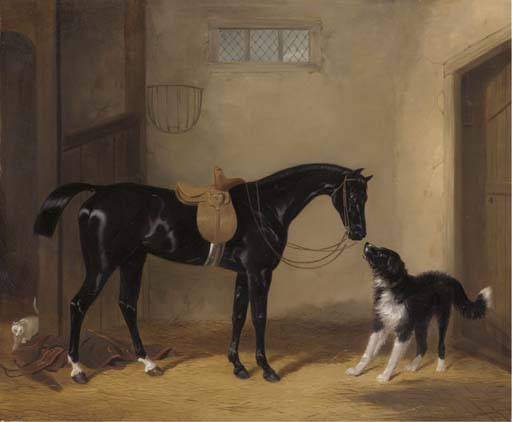
Portrait of a saddled black hunter with a sheep dog in a stable (1837)

William Barraud (1810 – 1 October 1850) was an English animal painter and illustrator, the brother of Henry Barraud, with whom he collaborated on many works.

== Biography ==
William was born in Lambeth in London, one of 17 children of William Francis Barraud (1783–1833), a clerk in the Custom House, and Sophia (née) Hull. His paternal grandfather was Paul Philip Barraud an eminent chronometer maker in Cornhill, and his maternal grandfather, Thomas Hull, a miniature painter. The family was of French Huguenot origin that had come over to England at the time of the revocation of the Edict of Nantes. His younger brother Henry Barraud was also a notable artist, and another, Edward, though talented in art did not take it up as a profession.

On leaving school he is said to have become a clerk in the Custom House where his father worked (although there are no records of this), but eventually became a pupil of artist Abraham Cooper. As an animal artist he specialised in painting horses and dogs, exhibiting at the Royal Academy from 1829–50, the British Institution from 1828–49, the Society of British Artists and at other venues. His work was popular with huntsmen and dog-fanciers. He also produced some historical and landscape paintings.

William shared a studio, from 1835 until his untimely death, with his brother Henry, and collaborated on many subject pictures with himself painting the animals and Henry the figures. Several of these joint works were exhibited at the Royal Academy. The brothers also produced a book together entitled "Sketches of Figures and Animals" (H. Graves and Co. c. 1850). William also collaborated on another book with fellow artist Thomas Fairland (1804–52) called "The book of animals drawn from nature" (C. Tilt, 1846).

In 1841 William married Mary Ratliff and they had a son Clement William Barraud (1843–1926), who went on to become a stained-glass designer (for Lavers, Barraud and Westlake), a Jesuit priest, poet and playwright. Mary died soon after the birth and in 1850 William married Margaret Harrison.

William died in Kensington, London from dysentery and typhoid fever on 1 October 1850, in his fortieth year.
