= Cyril =

- Pronunciation: /ˈsɪrəl/
- Gender: Male

Origin
- Origin: Greek

Other names
- Related names: Cirillo, Cyrille, Cyryl, Cyrillus, Kiril, Kirill, Kyrillos, Kiryl, Kyrylo, Kiro, Kyril, Quirrel

Cyril (also Cyrillus or Cyryl) is a masculine given name. It is derived from the Greek name Κύριλλος (Kýrillos), meaning 'lordly, masterful', which in turn derives from Greek κυριος (kýrios) 'lord'. There are various variant forms of the name Cyril such as Cyrill, Cyrille, Ciril, Kirill, Kiryl, Kirillos, Kyrylo, Kiril, Kiro, Kyril, Kyrill and Quirrel.

Notable people with the name include:

== Christian patriarchs or bishops ==
- Cyril of Jerusalem (c. 313 – 386), theologian and bishop
- Cyril of Alexandria (c. 376 – 444), Patriarch of Alexandria from 412 to 444
- Cyril the Philosopher (826–869), co-invented the Slavic alphabet (Glagolitic) and translated the Bible into Old Church Slavonic; namesake of the Cyrillic alphabet
- Pope Cyril II of Alexandria (1050–1092), Head of the Coptic Church from 1078 to 1092
- Greek Patriarch Cyril II of Alexandria, 12th-century Greek Patriarch of Alexandria
- Cyril of Turaw (1130–1182), Belarusian bishop and orthodox saint
- Pope Cyril III of Alexandria (1235–1243), Head of the Coptic Church from 1235 to 1243
- Cyril I of Serbia, reigned 1407–1419
- Cyril, Metropolitan of Moscow (died 1572), Metropolitan of Moscow and all Rus' from 1568 to 1572
- Cyril Lucaris (Patriarch Cyril I of Constantinople), reigned for six terms between 1612 and 1638
- Cyril II of Constantinople, patriarch in 1633, 1635–1636, 1638–1639
- Patriarch Cyril III of Constantinople, patriarch in 1652 and 1654
- Cyril IV of Constantinople, patriarch 1711–1713
- Cyril V Zaim, Melkite patriarch of Antioch died 1720
- Cyril VI Tanas, Melkite patriarch of Antioch 1724–1760
- Patriarch Cyril V of Constantinople, patriarch in 1748–1751, 1752–1757
- Cyril II of Serbia, reigned 1759–1763
- Cyril VII Siaj, Melkite patriarch of Antioch 1794–1796
- Patriarch Cyril VI of Constantinople, patriarch in 1813–1818
- Cyril, Metropolitan of Belgrade, Metropolitan of Belgrade during 1825–1827
- Patriarch Cyril II of Jerusalem, reigned 1845–1875
- Patriarch Cyril VII of Constantinople, patriarch in 1855–1860
- Pope Cyril IV of Alexandria (1816–1861), Head of the Coptic Church from 1854 to 1861
- Pope Cyril V of Alexandria (1824–1927), Head of the Coptic Church from 1874 to 1927
- Cyril VIII Jaha, Melkite patriarch of Antioch 1902–1916
- Cyril IX Moghabghab, Melkite patriarch of Antioch 1925–1946
- Patriarch Cyril of Bulgaria, reigned 1953–1971
- Pope Cyril VI of Alexandria (1902–1971), Head of the Coptic Church from 1959 to 1971
- Patriarch Cyril I of Moscow, reigning from 2009

== Other individuals ==
- Cyrillus, 5th-century Greek jurist
- Cyril Abeynaike (1911–1991), Sri Lankan Anglican bishop
- Cyril Abidi (born 1976), French kickboxer
- Cyril Abiteboul (born 1977), French motor racing engineer and manager
- Cyril Abotomey (1902–1980), Australian rugby league footballer
- Cyril Abraham (1915–1979), English screenwriter
- Cyril Adams (1897–1988), English cricketer and Royal Air Force officer
- Cyril Akpomedah (born 1979), French basketball player
- Cyril Aldred (1914–1991), English Egyptologist, art historian, and author
- Cyril Alington (1872–1955), English educationalist, scholar, cleric, and author
- Cyril Allcott (1896–1973), New Zealand cricketer
- Cyril Allen (1915–1985), English athlete
- George Cyril Allen (1900–1982), English economist
- Cyril Alliston (1891–1973), English cricketer
- Cyril Almeida, Pakistani journalist
- Cyril Andresen (1929–1977), Danish sailor
- Cyril Chukwuka Anyanwu, Anglican bishop in Nigeria
- Cyril Appleton (born 1930), British actor
- Cyril Archibald (1837–1914), Canadian politician
- Cyril Aris (born 1987), Lebanese director
- Cyril Ashton (born 1942), British Anglican bishop
- Cyril Asker (born 1985), French mixed martial arts fighter
- Cyril Astruc (born 1973), French-Israeli businessman
- Cyril Atanassoff (born 1941), Bulgarian dancer originally from France
- Cyril Atkinson (1874–1967), English barrister and politician
- Cyril Eugene Attygalle (1905–1980), Sri Lankan Sinhala politician
- Cyril Aures, American politician
- Cyril Axelrod (born 1942), South African Roman Catholic priest
- Cyril Ayling (1910–1993), Argentine cricketer
- Cyril Ayris (born 1935), Western Australian historian and journalist
- Cyril Babbage (1917–1976), British flying ace of WWII
- Cyril Bacon (1919–2001), English footballer
- Cyril Bailey (1871–1957), British author, fellow, tutor and librarian at Balliol College, Oxford
- Cyril Baille (born 1993), French rugby union player
- Cyril Baily (1880–1924), English cricketer
- Cyril Baker (1885–1949), English cricketer
- Cyril Stanley Bamberger (1919–2008), British RAF pilot
- Cyril Banks (1901–1969), British politician
- Cyril Baptiste (1949–2006), American basketball player
- Cyril of Barcelona (died after 1799), Spanish Capuchin and missionary bishop
- Cyril Bardsley (1870–1940), British Anglican bishop
- Cyril Bardsley (cyclist) (1931–2020), English cyclist
- Cyril Barlow (born 1889), English footballer
- Cyril Barnes (1926–2000), Anglican priest
- Cyril Henry Barraud (1877–1965), British artist
- Edwin Cyril Geddes Barrett (1909–1986), British colonial administrator
- Cyril Barthe (born 1996), French racing cyclist
- Cyril Joe Barton (1921–1944), Recipient of the Victoria Cross
- Cyril Baselios (1935–2007), Syro-Malankara Catholic major archbishop
- Cyril Bassett (1892–1983), Recipient of the Victoria Cross
- Cyril Baudouin (born 1953), France international rugby league footballer
- Cyril Bavin (1878–1956), New Zealand-born Australian Methodist minister and missionary
- Cyril Beach (1909–1980), English footballer
- Cyril W. Beaumont (1891–1976), British dance historian
- Cyril Beavon (1937–2017), English footballer
- Cyril Beech (1925–2001), English footballer
- Cyril Beeson (1889–1975), British entomologist
- Cyril Beldam (1869–1940), English cricketer
- Cyril of Beloozero (1337–1427), Russian monk and saint
- Cyril Belshaw (1921–2018), New Zealand-born Canadian anthropologist
- Cyril Kobina Ben-Smith (born 1964), Ghanaian Anglican Bishop and Archbishop
- Cyril Bence (1902–1992), Welsh toolmaker, part-time lecturer and politician
- Cyril Benoit (born 1974), French entrepreneur
- Cyril Benzaquen (born 1989), French kickboxer
- Cyril J. Bergtheil (1878–1973), English chemist, bacteriologist, and zoologist
- Cyril Berry (1918–2002), British newspaper editor
- Cyril Bessy (born 1986), French cyclist
- Cyril Bibby (1914–1987), British sexologist
- Cyril Biddulph (1887–1918), Canadian actor
- Cyril Bieri (born 1993), Swiss bobsledder
- Cyril Birch (1925–2023), British-American sinologist
- Cyril Handley Bird (1896–1969), British civil servant
- Cyril Asquith, Baron Asquith of Bishopstone (1890–1954), English barrister, judge
- Cyril Black (1902–1991), British politician
- Cyril Edwin Black (1915–1989), American historian
- Cyril Blacklock (1880–1936), British Army general
- Cyril Blake (1900–1951), Trinidad and Tobago musician
- Cyril Bland (1872–1950), British cricketer
- Cyril Blažo (born 1970), Slovak artist
- Cyril Bos (born 1972), French cyclist
- Cyril Bouda (1901–1984), Czech painter, graphic artist, illustrator, and university professor
- Cyril E. Bousfield (1870–1959), American physician and Baptist missionary
- Cyril Y. Bowers (1924–2020), American biochemist
- Cyril Bowles (1916–1999), English Anglican bishop
- Cyril Bridge (1909–1988), English footballer
- Cyril Briggs (1888–1966), American writer
- Cyril Briggs (footballer) (1918–1998), English footballer
- Cyril Brine (1918–1988), British motorcycle speedway rider
- Cyril Bristow (1899–1978), British cinematographer
- Robert Cyril Claude Brooks (1930–1944), Youngest Canadian soldier to die in WWII
- Cyril Brown (1918–1990), English footballer
- Cyril Browne (cricketer) (1893–1948), English cricketer
- Cyril Brownlie (1895–1954), New Zealand rugby union player
- Cyril Buckley (1905–1974), English cricketer
- Cyril Buffet (born 1958), French historian
- Cyril of Bulgaria (1901–1971), Patriarch of Bulgaria and Righteous Among the Nations
- Cyril Bulley (1907–1989), English bishop
- Cyril Buraman (born 1959), Nauruan politician
- Cyril Burke (1925–2010), Australian international rugby union player
- Cyril Burke (Australian rules footballer) (1905–1984), Australian rules footballer
- Cyril Burt (1883–1971), English educational psychologist
- Cyril "Squib" Burton (1908–1990), British motorcycle speedway rider
- Cyril B. Busbee (1908–2001), American educator
- Cyril Buscaglione (born 1972), French tennis player
- Cyril Salim Bustros (born 1939), Lebanese archbishop
- Cyril Butcher (1909–1987), English actor & director
- Cyril Buxton (1865–1892), English cricketer
- Cyril Byron (1920–2015), Tuskegee Airman and American baseball player
- Cyril Chambers (1897–1975), Australian politician
- Cyril Connolly (1903–1974), English literary critic and writer
- Cyryl Czarkowski-Golejewski (1885–1940), Polish landowner and wine producer
- Cyril Delevanti (1889–1975), British actor
- Cyril Despres (born 1974), French motorcycle rider
- Cyril De Zoysa (1896–1978), Sri Lankan businessman and Buddhist revivalist
- Cyril Dissanayaka, Sri Lankan Sinhala senior police officer
- Cyril Dodd (1844–1913), British politician
- Cyril Domoraud (born 1971), Ivorian football player
- Cyril Dunne (1941–2024), Irish Gaelic footballer
- Cyril Fernando (1895–1974), Sri Lankan Sinhala clinician and researcher
- Cyril Fletcher (1913–2005), English comedian, actor and businessman
- Cyril Flower, 1st Baron Battersea (1843–1907), British Liberal politician
- Ciryl Gane (born 1990), French mixed martial artist, former interim UFC heavyweight champion
- Cyril Gautier (born 1987), French racing cyclist
- Cyril Goulden (1897–1981), Welsh/Canadian geneticist, statistician, and agronomist
- Cyril Grayson (born 1993), American football player
- Cyril Haran (1931–2014), Gaelic footballer and manager, priest, scholar and schoolteacher
- Cyril Stanley Harrison (1915–1998), English cricketer
- Cyril Leo Heraclius, Prince Toumanoff (born Toumanishvili) (1913–1997), Russian-born historian and genealogist who was a professor emeritus at Georgetown University
- Cyril Herath (died 2011), Inspector-General of Sri Lanka Police from 1985 to 1988
- Cyril Hilsum (1925–2026), British physicist and academic
- Cyril Höschl (1949–2025), Czech psychiatrist and academic
- Cyril Jordan (born 1948), American guitarist and founder of the Flamin' Groovies
- Cyril Karabus (born 1935), South African paediatric oncologist
- Cyril Keeper (born 1943), Canadian politician
- Cyryl Klimowicz (born 1952), Roman Catholic bishop
- Cyril Knowles (1944–1991), English footballer
- C. M. Kornbluth (1923–1958), American science fiction author
- Cyril Langevine (born 1998), Guyanese–American basketball player in the Israeli Basketball Premier League
- Cyril Lawrence (1920–2020), English footballer
- Cyril Lewis (1909–1999), Welsh footballer
- Cyryl Lubowidzki (1824–1898), Catholic prelate
- Sister M. Cyril Mooney (1936–2023), educational innovator in India
- Cyril Nicholas (1898–1961), Sri Lankan Burgher army captain, civil servant, and forester
- Cyril Ornadel (1924–2011), British conductor and composer
- Elder Cyril Pavlov (1919–2017), Russian Orthodox Christian monk, mystic and wonder-worker
- Cyril Pearl (1904–1987), Australian journalist
- Cyril Perkins (1911–2013), English cricketer
- Cyril C. Perera (1923–2016), Sri Lankan Sinhala author, translator of world literature into Sinhala
- Cyril E. S. Perera (1892–1968), Sri Lankan Sinhala member of the Ceylon House of Representatives
- Cyril Pinto Jayatilake Seneviratne (1918–1984), Sri Lankan Sinhala military officer and politician
- Cyril Ponnamperuma (1923–1994), Sri Lankan Sinhala scientist in the fields of chemical evolution and the origin of life
- Cyril Ramaphosa (born 1952), South African president, businessman, and trade unionist
- Cyril Ranatunga, Sri Lankan Sinhala army general
- Cyryl Ratajski (1875–1942), Polish politician and lawyer
- Cyril Richardson (born 1990), American football player
- Cyril Riley, known mononymously as Cyril, an Australian musician, best known for his version of "Stumblin' In"
- Cyril Rioli (born 1989), Australian rules footballer
- Cyril Smith (1928–2010), English Liberal politician
- Cyril Stapleton (1914–1974), English musician and bandleader
- Cyril Symes (born 1943), Canadian politician
- Cyril Takayama (born 1973), American-Japanese magician
- Cyril Wecht (1931–2024), American forensic pathologist
- Cyril Wickramage (born 1932), Sri Lankan Sinhala actor, director, and vocalist
- Sir Cyril Wyche, 1st Baronet, British diplomat

== Fictional characters ==
- Cyril "Blakey" Blake, the bus depot inspector from the 1970s British comedy TV series On the Buses
- Cyril Fielding, character in E. M. Forster's novel A Passage to India
- Cyril Figgis, character in the TV series Archer
- Cyril O'Reily, character from television series Oz
- Cyril Sneer, the villain aardvark of the 1980s cartoon series The Raccoons
- Cyril the Fogman, a character from the television series Thomas & Friends
- Syril Karn, a character from the Star Wars TV series Andor

== See also ==
- Cyrille, a French masculine given name and a surname.
- Cirillo, the Italian form of the name
- Kyril, derived from the Greek name Κύριλλος (Kýrillos)
- Kyrylo, the Ukrainian form
