= Kirilo =

- Gender: male

Other names
- Related names: Cirillo, Cyril, Cyrille, Cyrillus, Kiril, Kirill, Kirillos, Kiryl, Kyrylo, Kiro

The male name Kirilo (Serbian Cyrillic: Кирило) is a first name commonly used among Serbs and other South Slavs, mainly in Serbia, Montenegro and Bosnia and Herzegovina. In origin, it is a Greek name (Greek: Κύριλλος). In various languages, distinctive forms of the same name are also used, like: Kiril (Kirill), Cyril (Cyrill), Cyryl (Polish), Kiryl (Belarusian), Kyril, Kyrill, Kyrylo (Ukrainian) and a diminutive Kiro (common in the Southeastern Europe).

== People with the name ==
- Kirilo I, Serbian Patriarch (1407–1419)
- Kirilo II, Serbian Patriarch (1759–1763)
- Kirilo Mitrović, Serbian bishop (1908–1931)

== See also ==
- Kiril
- Kirill
- Kyril
- Kyrylo
- Cyril
- Cirillo
