= Cyrill =

Cyrill is a given name. Notable people with the name include:

- Cyrill Akono (born 2000), German-Cameroonian professional footballer
- Cyrill Demian (1772–1849), Armenian inventor who made organs and pianos in Vienna, Austria
- Cyrill Gasser (born 1992), Swiss footballer
- Cyrill Gloor (born 1982), footballer from Switzerland
- Cyrill Gutsch, German-born designer and brand developer based in New York
- Cyrill Kistler (1848–1907), German composer, music theoretician, educator and publisher
- Cyrill Schmidiger (born 1978), Swiss former footballer

== See also ==
- Ss. Athanasius and Cyrill Church, a Romanian Orthodox church in Iași, Romania
- Cyril
