= Kyrill =

Kyrill may refer to:

- Kyrill (Dmitrieff) (born 1954), ruling bishop of the Western American Diocese of the Russian Orthodox Church Outside Russia
- Kyrill (Yonchev) (1945–2007), archbishop of the Orthodox Church in America
- Kyrill (storm), a European windstorm in January 2007

== See also ==
- Kyril
- Kirill (disambiguation)
- Kiril
