= Saint Cyril =

Saint Cyril (Latin: Cyrillus; Ancient Greek: Κύριλλος, Kýrillos) may refer to:

== People ==
- Cyril (died 320), one of the Forty Martyrs of Sebaste
- Cyril of Jerusalem (c. 313–386), Christian theologian and bishop
- Cyril of Alexandria (c. 376–444), Patriarch of Alexandria
- Cyril the Philosopher (826–869), Byzantine theologian and missionary, credited with devising the Glagolitic alphabet
- Pope Cyril II of Alexandria (1078–1092), Coptic Patriarch of Alexandria
- Cyril of Turov (1130–1182), Belarusian Orthodox theologian and bishop
- Cyril I of Serbia (died 1418 or 1419), Serbian Orthodox Patriarch from 1407 until his death
- Cyril of Beloozero (1337–1427), Russian Orthodox hegumen and disciple of St. Sergius of Radonezh
- Cyril Lucaris (1572–1638), six-time Ecumenical Patriarch of Constantinople between 1612 and 1638 and Greek Orthodox Patriarch of Alexandria
- Cyril VI of Constantinople (died 1821), Ecumenical Patriarch of Constantinople 1813–1818 and New Hieromartyr
- Pope Cyril V of Alexandria (1874–1927), Coptic Patriarch of Alexandria
- Cyril Smirnov (died 1937), Russian Orthodox Metropolitan of Kazan and New Hieromartyr, feast November 7
- Pope Cyril VI of Alexandria (1902–1971), Coptic Patriarch of Alexandria

== See also ==
- Cyril (disambiguation)
- Saints Cyril and Methodius (disambiguation)
- St. Cyril's Monastery (disambiguation)
