= Beatrice Heuser =

German historian and political scientist

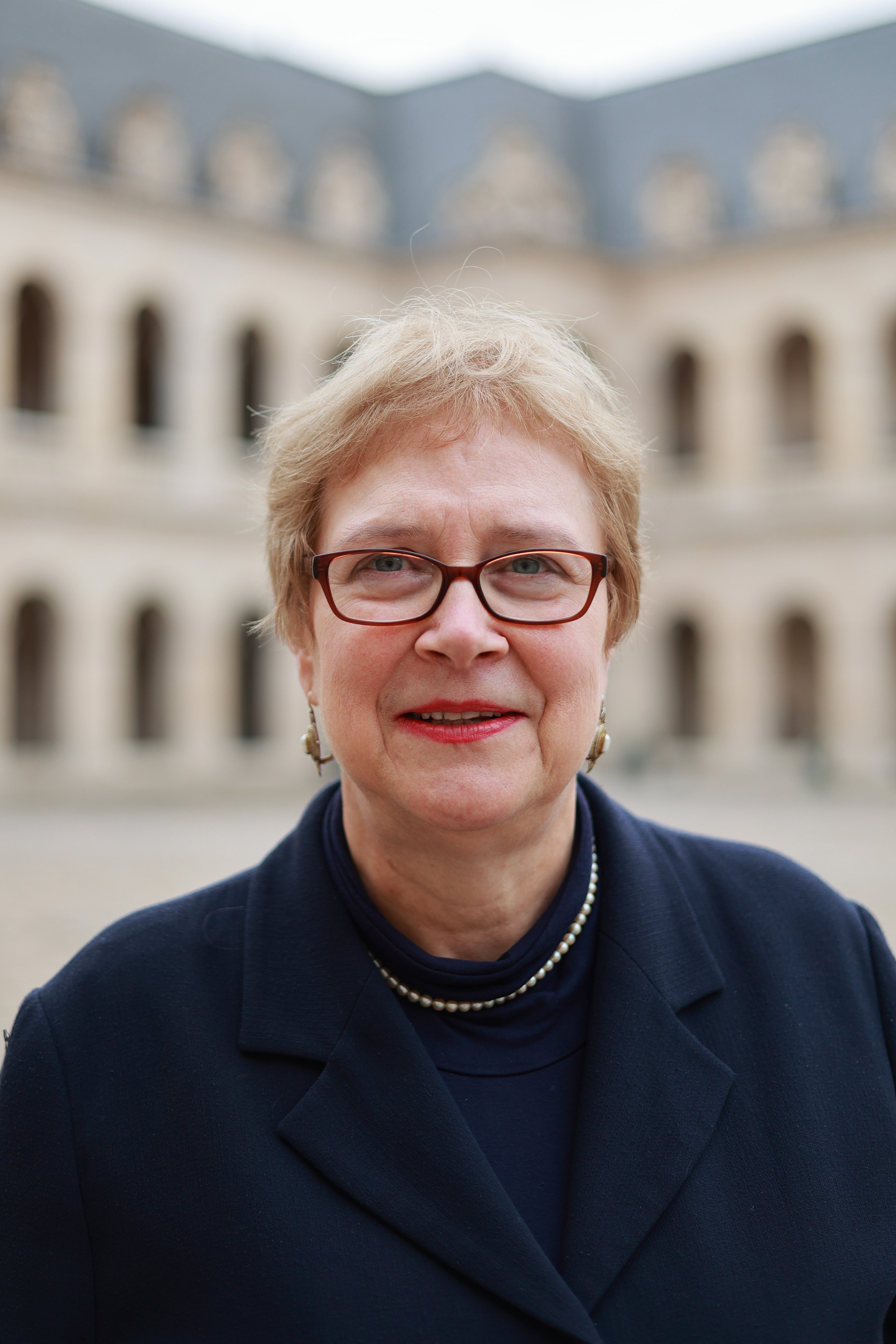
Historian and political scientist Beatrice Heuser - Paris, 2 Feb 2023

Beatrice Heuser (born 15 March 1961 in Bangkok) is a historian and political scientist. She held the chair of International Relations at the University of Glasgow until autumn 2024.

== Life ==
Heuser has a B.A. in History from Bedford College, an M.A. in International History from the London School of Economics and a D.Phil. in Political Science from the University of Oxford. In addition, she holds a Higher Doctorate from Marburg University. From 1989 to 1991, she worked at the Royal Institute of International Affairs in London. Subsequently, she became a lecturer and later a professor of Strategic Studies at King's College London. She has also taught in France at the University of Reims, and the Graduate School of Journalism in Lille, and in Germany at the University of Potsdam and the University of the Bundeswehr Munich. From 2003 to 2007, the director of the research section of the German Armed Forces Military History Research Office in Potsdam from 2003 to 2007. In 2007, she was appointed to a Chair of International Relations at the University of Reading. She left Reading for the Chair of IR at Glasgow in 2017.

In 2011 and 2012, she held visiting professorships at the University of Paris 8 (St Denis) and the University of Paris IV (Sorbonne) - the Chaire Dupront. From October 2017 to June 2018, Heuser held visiting professorships at the Sorbonne and at Sciences Po' Paris. From 2020 to 2022, she held the Jeff Grey Visiting Professorship at the Australian Defence College. Since 2022, she has lectured at the General Staff Academy of the German Bundeswehr. She is a non-stipendiary Distinguished Professor at the Brussels School of Governance at the Free University of Brussels.

Heuser studies war and specialises in strategic studies, especially nuclear strategy, strategic theory and strategic culture, the transatlantic relations as well as the foreign and defence policies of the United Kingdom, France and Germany.

== Bibliography ==
Monographs

- Flawed Strategy: Why Smart Leaders Make Bad Decisions (Hoboken: Polity Books, 2025), ISBN 978-1509566693.
- War: A Genealogy of Western Ideas and Practices (Oxford: Oxford University Press, 2022), ISBN 978-0198796893.
- Brexit in History. Sovereignty or a European Union? (London: Hurst 2019), ISBN 9781787381261.
- Strategy before Clausewitz: Linking Warfare and Statecraft (Abingdon: Routledge, 2017), ISBN 9781138290907 (hb); ISBN 9781138290914 (pb).
- The Strategy Makers: Thoughts on War and Society from Machiavelli to Clausewitz (Santa Barbara, CA: Praeger, 2010), ISBN 978-0-275-99826-4.
- The Evolution of Strategy: Thinking War from Antiquity to the Present (Cambridge: Cambridge University Press, 2010), ISBN 978-0-521-15524-3.
- Reading Clausewitz (London: Pimlico, 2002), ISBN 0-7126-6484-X.
- The Bomb: Nuclear Weapons in their Historical, Strategic and Ethical Context in the series: Turning Points in History (London: Longman's, 1999), ISBN 0-582-29290-5.
- Nuclear Mentalities? Strategies and Belief Systems in Britain, France and the FRG (London: Macmillan, and New York: St Martin's Press 1998), ISBN 0-312-21321-2.
- NATO, Britain, France and the FRG: Nuclear Strategies and Forces for Europe, 1949-2000 (London: Macmillan, and New York: St Martin's Press, 1997, ppb. 1998), ISBN 0-333-77477-9.
- Transatlantic Relations: Sharing Ideals and Costs Chatham House Paper (London: Pinter for RIIA, 1996), ISBN 1-85567-355-X.
- Western Containment Policies in the Cold War; The Yugoslav Case, 1948-1953 (London: Routledge, 1989), ISBN 0-415-01303-8.

Editorship

- (with Isabelle Davion): Batailles - Histoire des grandes mythes nationaux (Paris: Belin, 2020); ISBN 978-2410016963
- (with Athena Leoussi): Famous Battles and How They Shaped the Modern World vol 1: From Troy to Courtrai, 1200 BC-1302 AD (Barnsley, Yorkshire: Pen & Sword, 2018); ISBN 978-1473893733
- (with Athena Leoussi): Famous Battles and How They Shaped the Modern World vol. 2: From the Armada to Stalingrad, 1588-1943 (Barnsley, Yorkshire: Pen & Sword, 2018); ISBN 978-1526727411
- (with Tormod Heier & Guillaume Lasconjarias) Military Exercises: Political Messaging and Strategic Impact, NATO Forum Paper n°26, (Rome, NATO Defence College, April 2018), 396 p.; ISBN 978-88-96898-20-8 http://www.ndc.nato.int/download/downloads.php?icode=546
- (with Eitan Shamir): Insurgencies and Counterinsurgencies: National Styles and Strategic Cultures (Cambridge : Cambridge University Press, 2017); 389p, Index; ISBN 978-1-107-13504-8 (hb); ISBN 978-1-316-50100-9 (pb).
- Small Wars and Insurgencies in Theory and Practice, 1500-1850 (Abingdon: Routledge, 2015) ISBN 978113894167-0 (hb); ISBN 9781138299788 (pb), also as special issue of Small Wars and Insurgencies.
- Carl von Clausewitz: On War abridged edition in the series Oxford Classics (Oxford: Oxford University Press, 2006), ISBN 978-0-19-954002-0; https://shepherd.com/book/on-war
- (with Anja Victorine Hartmann): Thinking War, Peace and World Orders from Antiquity until the 20th century (London: Routledge, 2001), ISBN 0-415-24441-2.
- (with Cyril Buffet): Haunted by History: Myths in International Relations (Oxford: Berghahn, 1998), ISBN 1-57181-940-1.
- (with Robert O'Neill): Securing Peace in Europe, 1945-62: Thoughts for the Post-Cold War Era (London: Macmillan, 1992) ISBN 0-333-55002-1.
- Nuclear Weapons and the Future of European Security, London Defence Studies No.8 (1991).

Select Articles

- 'Analyzing a Country’s Strategic Posture: Suggestions for Practitioners’, Joint Forces Quarterly No. 110 (July 2023), pp.88/97.
- 'Fortuna, chance, risk and opportunity in strategy', in Journal of Strategic Studies, Vol. 45 No. 5 (2022), pp. 1-26.
- 'Change and Continuity in War: the 2022 J.G. Grey Oration', in Australian Journal of Defence and Strategic Studies Vol. 4 No. 2 (2022).
- 'Clausewitz, die Politik and the political purpose of Strategy’, in Thierry Balzacq and Ron Krebs (eds): The Oxford Handbook of Grand Strategy (Oxford: Oxford University Press, 2021), pp. 57-72.
- 'Ordinances and Articles of War before the Lieber Code, 866-1863: the long pre-history of International Humanitarian Law', in Yearbook of International Humanitarian Law Vol. 21 (2018), pp. 139-164.
- 'Regina Maris and the Command of the Sea: The Sixteenth Century Origins of Modern Maritime Strategy', Journal of Strategic Studies Vol. 40 No. 1-2 (2017), pp. 225-262.
- 'Defeats as moral victories', in Andrew Hom & Cian O’Driscoll (eds): Moral Victories: The Ethics of Winning Wars (Oxford: Oxford University Press, 2017), pp. 52-68.
- 'Theory and Practice, Art or Science of Warfare: an Etymological Note', in Daniel Marston and Tamara Leahy (eds):War, History and Strategy; Essays in Honour of Professor Robert O’Neill (Canberra: ANU Press, 2016), ISBN 9781760460235; pp.179-196.
- 'Victory, Peace, and Justice: The Neglected Trinity', Joint Forces Quarterly Vol. 69 (April 2013), pp. 6-12.
- 'The Soviet response to the Euromissile crisis, 1982-83', in Leopoldo Nuti (ed.): The Crisis of Détente in Europe: From Helsinki to Gorbachev, 1975-1985 (London: Routledge, 2008), ISBN 978-0415460514, pp. 137-149.
- 'Victory in a Nuclear War? A Comparison of NATO and WTO War Aims and Strategies', Contemporary European History Vol. 7 Part 3 (November 1998), pp. 311-328.
- 'Warsaw Pact Military Doctrines in the 70s and 80s: Findings in the East German Archives', Comparative Strategy Vol. 12 No. 4 (Oct.-Dec. 1993), pp. 437-457.

Podcasts Talking Strategy , with Paul O'Neill, RUSI
