= Kyril =

- Gender: male

Origin
- Origin: Κύριλλος [Kýrillos]

Other names
- Related names: Cyril, Cyrille

The given name Kyril or Kyrill is male name, deriving from the Greek name Κύριλλος (Kýrillos) which in turn derives from Greek κύριος (kýrios) "lord". There are many variant forms of the name: Cyril, Cyrill, Cy, Kiril, Kirill, Kiro, Kiryl, Kyryl, Kirillos, Kyrillo, Kyrylo.

The name belongs to several religious figures known as Saint Cyril.

== People with the given name ==
- Kyril, Prince of Preslav (born 1964)
- Kyril Louis-Dreyfus (born 1997), French businessman

== See also ==
- Cyril
