= Cyril Browne =

Cyril Browne may refer to:

- Snuffy Browne (1890–1964), West Indian cricketer
- Cyril Browne (cricketer) (1893–1948), English cricketer
