= Alliston (surname) =

Alliston is an English surname, found mainly in North Essex and South West Suffolk. Variations include Liston and Alston, which can also be traced to the same area, as well as finding origins in other locations, as well as Elliston, Allaston, and Ellystone.

The surname can be traced to the village of Liston, which appears in the Domesday Book, through the family that took the name in the late 12th century.

== Early origins ==
The earliest mention of the surname is the Liston variant; a Roger De Liston was a witness to a gift by Richard, Bishop of St Andrews, Scotland, in 1165. Liston was a village in Essex near Sudbury.

William I granted one manor in Liston to Talbot (held from Gurnai) and another to Ilbod, brother of Ernulf de Hesdin. The surname also occurs in England, when in 1185, Avicia De Lyston, widow of Godfrey the Chamberlain and daughter of Robert De Lyston, with a son who was of age, was bound as its holder facere canestellas ad summonicionem ad festum regis. This meant they made the wafers at the King's coronation. The son was John De Lyston from whom the surname arose. Robert De Lyston was likely the son of Geoffrey Talbot who held Liston at the time of the Domesday. His brother would have been Geoffrey Talbot, who was involved in the rebellion against King Stephen. Their mother was Agnes, who David Crouch states was a member of the De Lacy family. This would also make them related to Ilbod, brother of Arnulf De Hesdin, as he too was married to a De Lacy. This could explain how Avicia was holding both manors of Liston by 1185. However Katharine Keats-Rohan states that Agnes was probably the daughter of Helto Dapifer, in which case there would be a different inheritance route.

A Godfrey the Chamberlain can also be found in Scotland.

The earliest mention of the surname Alliston in Suffolk is a Feet of Fines record in 1224 when John, son of Adam de Alliston, sold land at Stansfield Suffolk.

Stanfeld is a small village just north of Sudbury and Liston. In the time of Richard I, there was also a Feet of Fines record: 23 William son of Agnes v. Geoffrey son of Godfrey in Stanefeld. This is Geoffrey, son of Godfrey, buying land in Stanfeld. It is possible that the Godfrey mentioned is the same Godfrey husband of Avicia, Adam de Alliston (a Liston) could well be another son; Avicia's sons would then be John, Adam and Geoffrey.

== Essex Listons ==
A Godfrey De Liston also held Liston in 1226. He, too, was bound to make the wafers for the King's coronation. Another of his lands was Witham, another manor granted to the Ilbod mentioned earlier, so there seems to be some consistency in land holdings from the Domesday. He is probably the Godfrey De Liston who was Bailiff of Cookham, Berkshire. A Godfrey De Liston was also warden of nearby Windsor Forest in the time of Henry III. Godfrey is mentioned a few times in relation to Windsor Castle in the time of Henry III.

Also around 1270, in Long Melford, Suffolk, not far from Liston, lived Nigel De Liston. He had a son, Thomas, who was married to Alice; their sons were John and Simon. Thomas was a clerk to Sir William De Valence, Earl of Pembroke.

Godfrey died in 1267 and had a son, John De Liston, who died in 1332.

In 1296 John De Liston was ordered to do military service for the defence of the sea coast for holding lands in Essex. He was unfit for service.

In 1335, there was a surviving charter from Eleanor De Liston, wife of John De Liston, for Richard and Ellen de Strelleye.

She had remarried, so John must have died a few years earlier. They had a son, John, who was 22 at the time of her charter. He died in 1349, leaving a son named John born in 1337. He died in 1359, having no issue and the property went to William De Liston, his uncle who was over 30. This William had a son Thomas who was born in 1341.

A John and Thomas De Liston both fought in the 100-year war against France, fighting alongside John Hawkwood (probably related), William Bohun, and De Vere. This included Crecy in 1346.

== Surname development ==
In Essex the family names seem to have two variants emerging and other family surnames may be merging.

A William Alston is on record as having lived at Stistead not far from Hedingham in the time of Edward I (1272–1307), when "William Alston of Stisted in Essex, for want of warranty of Burkscraft in Stisted did grant or confirm to John de Carpenter of Naylinghurst, so much of the better land in Stisted except his mansion house there". In the time of Edward III, Hugh Alston bore for arms, azure ten stars or four, three, two and one, which was long before coat armour was granted by patent: Henry and Robert Alston also mentioned in the Botule (?) Hundredorum as having land at Fulbourn Cambridgeshire.

The will of Thomas Alston, 30 August 1469, mentions his brother William, and also a John Alston, whose relationship is not stated.

There was also a well-documented dispute between Sir Robert Wingfield and a John Liston in 1440 when John Lyston successfully sued Sir Robert Wingfield for 700 marks. Sir Robert was Steward for Thomas Mowbray Duke of Norfolk and their response was to have John Lyston outlawed. William De la Pole first Earl of Suffolk thought this heavy handed and seems to have had a part in getting the Duke of Norfolk and Sir Robert Wingfield arrested. William De Le Pole was husband of Alice Chaucer, granddaughter of the poet Geoffrey Chaucer, a friend of John Hawkwood and John Liston mentioned above.

John Lyston seems to have a brother named Robert who is mentioned in feet of fines at this time, and some sources name Robert in the dispute. Robert's wife was Isabel who died in 1491.

John De Vere, 13th Earl of Oxford, left a William Eliston 40 shillings in his will.

Lawrence Elliston, his grandson, was mentioned in the will of the 15th and 16th Earls. William Elliston was mentioned in the will of the 13th Earl of Oxford. They were 40 shilling yeomen being paid 40 shillings on the death of their feudal lord. Lawrence was the last to be in a feudal relationship with the De Veres. He was granted land in Cornwall for use during his stay.

There is also a mention of a Hugh Austyn or Allstyn mentioned in the medieval soldiers database in 1415, as a soldier with Richard De Vere 11th Earl of Oxford. He would have fought at Agincourt.

Another early branch of the family seem to have moved to Scotland early on, where they established themselves near Edinburgh.

The Scottish Liston seems to be traceable to William Liston in the 1500s, and to have connections to both the Knights Templar and Knights Hospitaller. Temple Liston near Edinburgh may be connected to them.

There is also a Liston variant in Ireland where it is said a Liston accompanied Henry II during the period following the death of Thomas Becket.

Another migration to Scotland seems to have happened in Scotland in the 14th century when Hugh Alston ending up fighting for Robert De Bruce.

== Coat of arms ==
The coat of arms of the Scottish family are the same as those for the Suffolk Alston branch, and also the arms found on Eleanor de Lyston's charter for Richard and Ellen de Strelleye in 1335, which shows her seal. It is apparent her coat of arms is the same as the Alston family. It is given as Azure, ten stars of six points, four, three, two, one, or.

A variant can also be found in a coat of arms of the Drewery family. Here it has been modified, losing the top row and relates to the Liston family. The stars are replaced with five-petal daisies. The church at the village of Liston contains a 12th-century Romanesque feature above a bricked up door on the north wall. At each end is a daisy.

The Elliston branch seems to have acquired a new coat of arms about the time of the battle of Bosworth (13th Earl of Oxford). They started using the arms of Maur De Eylston, who is mentioned on the Collins Roll of Edward I in the 1290s. The Ellistons and Eylstones do not appear to be related but the Eylstone variant is rare so the original holders may have died out.

In the Collins Roll I 'Erdeswickes version' (lost original from circa 1295), the Arms of Mane de Eglestone are given as Per pale Gules and Vert an Eagle displayed Argentin ?. In Collins Roll II 'Dethick's version' (lost original, 15th-century additions to above only), the Arms of Malg' de Eyleston are again given as Per Pale Gules and vert an Eagle displayed Argent. Similar blazons are given in several visitations of Essex, and a similar arms appears in the church at Gestingthorpe, Essex, on the memorial to John Elliston.

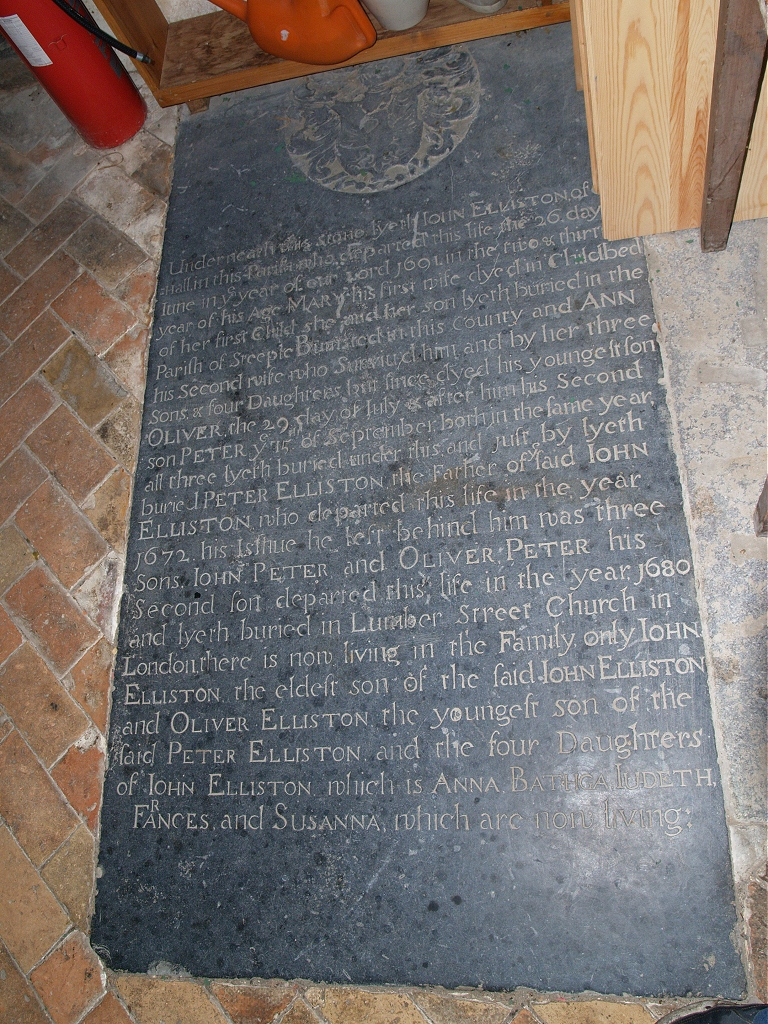
Memorial To John Elliston in St Marys, Gestingthorpe, Essex

== Notable people ==
Notable people with the surname include:

- Buddy Alliston (1933–2021), American football player
- Cyril Alliston (1891–1973), English cricketer
