= Cyril E. Bousfield =

American physician and Baptist missionary (1870–1959)

Cyril Eustace Bousfield
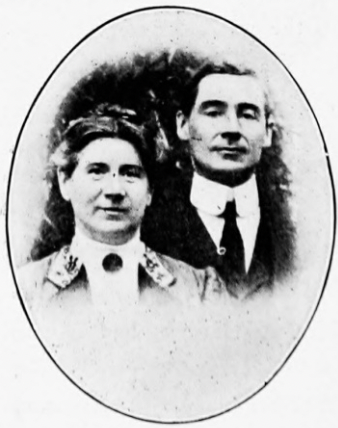
- Born: October 31, 1870; Somerset, England
- Died: 1959 (aged 88–89); Woolwich, Maine
- Education: University of Cambridge; Harvard Medical School
- Spouse: Lillian Snowden Bousfield

Cyril Eustace Bousfield (30 October 1870 – 1 March 1959) was an American physician and Baptist medical missionary. He served as the medical director in the American Baptist Mission Hospital, working for 40 years in China, with a focus on Shaoxing, Xunwu, and Chaoyang. He founded the Sunwuhsien Mission Hospital and introduced smallpox vaccination there during an outbreak. He is most noted for his work on leprosy. His correspondence and photographs have become primary sources for scholars studying the history of the Chinese communist uprising era.

== Early life ==
Cyril Eustace Bousfield was born in Bishop's Hull, Somerset, England on October 30, 1870. He was raised an Anglican and began studying Latin at seven and Greek at eleven. Bousfield earned a B.A. and M.A. from Christ's College, Cambridge, and was ordained upon graduation. He became one of three associate pastors in one of the most significant Anglican churches in London. Soon after, he set off for missionary work in China.

== Personal life ==
During his time as a missionary in China, Bousfield turned to the Baptist faith and affiliated with the American Baptist Foreign Missionary Society. There, he met Lillian "Lillie" Snowden, whom he later married. Bousfield's missionary work led him to believe that more people could be won over to Christianity if he practiced medicine. He took an extended furlough in the United States for his studies, obtaining a medical degree.

Bousfield had four children named Neal Dow Bousfield, Weston Ashmore Bousfield, Theodore Goddard Bousfield, and Roger Eustace Bousfield. Bousfield was the president of the Leeds Branch of the National Association for the Promotion of Technical Education.

== Education ==
He studied at the University of Cambridge, from which he graduated in 1893. Bousfield studied at Harvard Medical School, carrying out a resident year at Pennsylvania Medical School in Shanghai.

== Career ==
=== Mission ===
C.E. Bousfield and his wife, with the American Baptist Foreign Mission Society, carried out their mission in Shaohing. He also worked in Xunwu and Chaoyang.

Bousfield first went to China in 1896, associated with the Anglican church. He returned in 1899 with the American Baptist Foreign Missionary Society.

In 1900, Bousfield was working with the people of Tsih-Kiang, now known as Zhejiang, on a daily basis and had already learned to speak two dialects. Before July 28, he had been in Shanghai and encountered all classes of Chinese people, spending time amongst communities as the sole foreigner. Bousfield was vocal about the way in which other missionaries were using their positions to gain political power, citing their abuse of such power as the reason for a series of uprisings. On July 17 in Kinhwa, Bousfield and his family were attacked by a mob, fueled by hate for foreigners, in a colleague's home. After escaping to Lan-ki, Hangchow, and finally Shanghai via boat, Bousfield learned that the mob had killed eight missionaries in a neighboring city. Soon after his mission sent Bousfield and his family home, and on August 7, they left Shanghai on a steamer boat, arriving in San Francisco on August 28. They stayed in America for just five months, returning to China.

In spring of 1903 in Shaoxing, Bousfield saw an uptick in the number of people with a positive attitude towards Christianity. In April and May, however, famine riots halted this progress due to rice scarcities. Cholera swept through the area shortly afterwards until October brought a bountiful harvest.

In 1905, Bousfield fell ill and left Shaoxing for England on January 15. In March, the Bousfields rested in England. On July 4th, the Bousfields arrived in New York on the Kaiser Wilhelm II, finding a home in Dorchester, Boston. During his suspension, Bousfield and his family supplied the church at Lebanon, Maine.

In 1910, before the end of Bousfield's second term in the Chekiang province, he fell ill and asked to be transferred to a location with a different climate. Bousfield and his family were assigned to the South China Mission after working in the East China Mission. The Bousfields spent the first year at Kaying, now Meizhou. They moved to Changningzhen in Sun Wu, now Xunwu, county in May, 1912, opening a new station there. He was known to local residents as "Pastor Bao." Lillian Bousfield published a book about their experiences.

In 1918, the Bousfields left for the United States, where Bousfield worked towards his medical degree at Harvard Medical School, returning to China in 1920. After his return, the Bousfields continued their work in Xunwu. Bousfield opened the Sunwuhsien Mission Hospital. Smallpox ran rampant in the area, and Bousfield introduced vaccination. In Bousfield's first smallpox season he was only able to persuade 18 parents to allow him to vaccinate their children. In the second season, he was able to vaccinate around 100 people. In the third season, a Deacon at Vongshong invited Bousfield to vaccinate everyone in his village. Smallpox was particularly bad in that season, but everyone in that village survived. The Chinese then willingly got vaccines, and after a few years, smallpox was seldom seen.

After communists burned down Bousfield's hospital, home, and church building, he asked to be transferred to the Mission Hospital at Chaoyang in Liaoning, which is today Chaoyang Central Hospital. There, he was barred from having leprosy patients enter the hospital. Bousfield repaired an old ancestral temple behind his house, telling the patients to go every Monday and Friday, where he treated them. Bousfield had to add two more weekdays to accommodate for the sheer number of patients. His working hours were long and harrowing, because he aimed to tailor his treatments to each patient to minimize discomfort.

=== Publications ===
Bousfield wrote articles and books.

==== Articles ====
- "Notes on the Treatment of Leprosy", New England Journal of Medicine, 1934
- "Questions and Answers on the Truth", Baptist Mission Press
- "Helps to International Sunday School Lessons", Baptist Mission Press
- "Notes on B. Y. P. Y. Topics", published in Chinese
- "Statement of Christian Doctrines", published in Chinese
- "Several Tracts and Almanacs", published in Chinese

==== Book ====
- It Happened in China, Cyril Bousfield.

== Death ==
Bousfield and his family settled in Maine upon the conclusion of his work. His wife died in 1946. Bousfield died in Woolwich, Maine in 1959.

His papers are included in the American Baptist Historical Society Repository at Mercer University.
