= Accrington Stanley F.C. (1891) =

Former association football club in England

- Full name: Accrington Stanley Football Club
- Nickname(s): The 'Owd Reds
- Founded: 1891
- Dissolved: 1966; 59 years ago
- Ground: Peel Park, Accrington
- League: Lancashire Combination
- 1965–66: Resigned mid-season
Home colours

Accrington Stanley was an English football club based in Accrington, Lancashire. Established in 1891, the club played in the Football League between 1921 and 1962, when the club became the second to resign from the League mid-season. The club went into liquidation in 1966. They played at Peel Park.

== History ==
The club was formed in 1891 and played in the Football League between 1921 and 1962.

In 1960, amid persistent financial difficulties, mainly relating to the speculative purchase of the new Burnley Road stand, Stanley was relegated to the recently formed Division Four. However, the team only managed to complete one full season in that division because bankruptcy followed shortly afterwards. On 12 February 1962, Edwin Slinger, the chairman, resigned and revealed that Stanley owed up to £4,000 in unpaid transfer fees and a similar sum to the Inland Revenue. Pilkington, as life vice-president, brought in Bob Lord, who persuaded the rest of the board to resign by promising to buy shares, despite his chairmanship of the nearby Burnley Football Club. Stanley lost its last League match 4–0 away at Crewe on 2 March 1962 and, at a creditors' meeting shortly afterwards, further unsecured creditors were revealed. The club sent a letter of resignation to the Football League, and the resignation was accepted by Alan Hardaker, the League Secretary, on 11 March, midway through the 1961–62 season.

Stanley was accepted into the Lancashire Combination Division Two for the next season, and with some local investors stepping forward to reduce debts to a more manageable level, it seemed as if it might be a new beginning for the club. It performed respectably well in its first season in the Combination, and the team earned its first (and only) promotion the following year. Unfortunately this proved to be a false dawn, as Stanley was immediately relegated after finishing bottom of Division One. After four seasons in the Lancashire Combination the club disbanded. Two years later the club was reformed.

== Honours ==
Chart of the club's table finishes in the Football League.

- Lancashire Combination
  - Champions: 1902–03, 1905–06
  - Division Two champions: 1963–64

== Notable players ==
Players who played 100 matches for Accrington Stanley, or who gained international caps whilst with the club.

- Harry Anders (1957–60)
- Jimmy Anders (1956–60)
- Jimmy Armstrong (1927–33)
- Armour Ashe (1953–58)
- Cyril Briggs (1946–50)
- Tommy Butler (1947–53)
- Les Cocker (1953–58)
- Doug Daniels (1949–53)
- Wattie Dick (1955–58)
