= Kirill (disambiguation) =

Kirill may refer to:

- Kirill, a male given name
- Kirill (Gundyaev), a Russian Orthodox bishop
- Kirill (web series), an online science fiction drama

== See also ==
- Kyrill (disambiguation)
