= Becky Berk =

American politician

Member-elect of the New Hampshire House of Representatives from the Merrimack 13th district
- Assuming office December 2026
- Succeeding: Cyril Aures

Personal details
- Party: Independent

Becky Berk is an American politician. An independent, she is the member-elect for the Merrimack 13th district of the New Hampshire House of Representatives.
