= Kyrylo =

Kyrylo (Ukrainian: Кирило) is a Ukrainian male name of Ancient Greek origin, an equivalent of "Cyril".

Notable eople with the name include:

== Sports figures ==
=== Footballers ===
- Kyrylo Antonenko (born 1991), Ukrainian footballer
- Kyrylo Bohatenko (born 1988), Ukrainian footballer
- Kyrylo Davydov (born 1988), Ukrainian footballer
- Kyrylo Dihtyar (born 2007), Ukrainian footballer
- Kyrylo Doroshenko (born 1989), Ukrainian footballer
- Kyrylo Dryshlyuk (born 1999), Ukrainian footballer
- Kyrylo Khovayko (born 2001), Ukrainian footballer
- Kyrylo Kostenko (born 1998), Ukrainian footballer
- Kyrylo Kovalchuk (born 1986), Ukrainian footballer
- Kyrylo Kovalets (born 1993), Ukrainian footballer
- Kyrylo Kryvoborodenko (born 1996), Ukrainian footballer
- Kyrylo Matvyeyev (born 1996), Ukrainian footballer
- Kyrylo Melichenko (born 1999), Ukrainian footballer
- Kyrylo Nesterenko (born 1992), Ukrainian footballer
- Kyrylo Petrov (born 1990), Ukrainian footballer
- Kyrylo Prokopchuk (born 1998), Ukrainian footballer
- Kyrylo Romanyuk (born 2001), Ukrainian footballer
- Kyrylo Senko (born 2002), Ukrainian footballer
- Kyrylo Siheyev (born 2004), Ukrainian footballer
- Kyrylo Silich (born 1990), Ukrainian footballer
- Kyrylo Sydorenko (born 1985), Ukrainian footballer
- Kyrylo Yanitskyi (born 2003), Ukrainian footballer

=== Other sports ===
- Kyrylo Azarov (born 2007), Ukrainian diver
- Kyrylo Chuprynin (born 1975), Ukrainian athlete who competed in the men's discus throw at the 2000 Summer Olympics
- Kyrylo Fesenko (born 1986), Ukrainian basketball player
- Kyrylo Garashchenko (born 1998), Ukrainian Paralympic swimmer
- Kyrylo Hurnov (born 2003), Ukrainian taekwondo practitioner
- Kyrylo Marsak (born 2004), Ukrainian figure skater
- Kyrylo Mieshkov (fl. 2010s), Ukrainian wrestler
- Kyrylo Poida (fl. 2020s), Ukrainian para swimmer
- Kyrylo Pospyeyev (born 1975), Ukrainian cyclist
- Kyrylo Tsarenko (born 2000), Ukrainian cyclist
- Kyrylo Tsypun (born 1987), Ukrainian futsal player

== Others ==
- Kyrylo Budanov (born 1986), Ukrainian army major general and chief of the Main Intelligence Directorate
- Kyrylo Myzgin (born 1983), Ukrainian archaeologist and numismatist
- Kyrylo Seletskyi (1835–1918), Ukrainian priest of the Greek Catholic Diocese of Przemyśl, and an educational and social activist
- Kyrylo Shevchenko (born 1972), Ukrainian banker and the Chairman of the National Bank of Ukraine
- Kyrylo Stavrovetsky or Stavrovetskyi (died 1646), Ruthenian (Ukrainian) church figure of the Polish–Lithuanian Commonwealth
- Kyrylo Stetsenko (1882–1922), Ukrainian composer, conductor, critic, and teacher
- Kyrylo Studynsky (1868–1941), Ukrainian political and cultural figure
- Kyrylo Synelnykov (1901–1966), Soviet and Ukrainian physicist who participated in the Soviet atomic bomb project
- Kyrylo Tymoshenko (born 1989), Ukrainian politician who served as deputy Head of the Office of the President of Ukraine

== See also ==
- Kirill, Kirilo
