= Doug Daniels =

English footballer (1924–2004)

Personal information
- Full name: Douglas Daniels
- Date of birth: 21 August 1924
- Place of birth: Salford, England
- Date of death: 2004 (aged 79–80)
- Position: Goalkeeper

Senior career*
Years	Team	Apps	(Gls)
1947–1948	New Brighton	25	(0)
1948–1949	Chesterfield	0	(0)
1949–1953	Accrington Stanley	112	(0)
Total		137	(0)
- * Club domestic league appearances and goals

Douglas Daniels (21 August 1924 – 2004) was an English professional footballer who played as a goalkeeper in the Football League.
