= Francis Browne (cricketer) =

English cricketer, schoolteacher, and clergyman

Francis Ross Browne

Personal information
- Full name: Francis Bernard Ross Browne
- Born: 28 July 1899; Eastbourne, Sussex, England
- Died: 11 March 1970 (aged 70); Pewsey, Wiltshire, England
- Nickname: Tishy
- Batting: Right-handed
- Bowling: Right-arm fast-medium
- Relatives: Cyril Browne (brother) Christopher Ross Browne (son) "Mick" Ross Browne (son)

Domestic team information
- Years: Team
- 1919 to 1932: Sussex
- 1921 to 1922: Cambridge University

Career statistics
| Competition | First-class |
|---|---|
| Matches | 75 |
| Runs scored | 333 |
| Batting average | 5.74 |
| 100s/50s | 0/0 |
| Top score | 26 not out |
| Balls bowled | 13,373 |
| Wickets | 252 |
| Bowling average | 20.72 |
| 5 wickets in innings | 15 |
| 10 wickets in match | 1 |
| Best bowling | 8/39 |
| Catches/stumpings | 34/0 |
- Source: Cricinfo, 9 January 2016

Canon Francis Bernard Ross Browne (28 July 1899 – 11 March 1970) was an English cricketer/bowler, schoolteacher and clergyman.

== Cricket career ==
Browne attended Eastbourne College, where he led the bowling in the First XI. He underwent military training at the Royal Military Academy, Woolwich, towards the end of World War I, receiving a commission in the Royal Garrison Artillery in September 1918. He then went up to Emmanuel College, Cambridge after the war.

Despite a bowling action which Wisden described as "a weird delivery that defies description" in which "he appeared to cross his legs and deliver the ball off the wrong foot", and which earned him the nickname "Tishy" after a racehorse with a strange gait, he was a successful bowler in first-class cricket from 1919 to 1932. He played for Cambridge University in 1921 and 1922, taking 68 wickets at an average of 14.44, with a best performance of 3 for 34 and 6 for 27 in a victory over Warwickshire in 1922.

He played as an amateur for Sussex from 1919 to 1932, usually in July and August during the school holidays. His best figures for Sussex were 3 for 17 and 7 for 62 in a narrow loss to Yorkshire in 1925. In all first-class cricket his best innings figures were 8 for 39 for H. D. G. Leveson-Gower's XI against Minor Counties in 1924.

He usually batted at number 11 and scored more than 13 runs in an innings only twice in his career: in the match against Lancashire in 1928 he made 14 not out and 26 not out.

== Later career ==
When he left Cambridge, Browne became a schoolmaster at St Andrew's prep school in Eastbourne, where he became joint headmaster. He was later rural dean at Firle and Beddingham in Sussex.

Whilst Rural Dean at Firle, he baptised Camilla Shand, who is now Queen Camilla, in November 1947.
