= Kiril =

- Gender: male

The male name Kiril (or Кирил or Кирилл) is a common first name in the Orthodox Slavic world, in particular in Bulgaria, North Macedonia, and Russia. It is also well known in Greece but in different forms like Kyriakos. (Note that in modern Russian the spelling Кирил is considered to be a mistake, the correct spelling is Кирилл.)

Kiril has several variant forms: Cyril, Cyrill, Kirill, Kirillos, Kiryl (Belarusian), Kyril, Cyryl (Polish), Kyrill, Kyrylo (Ukrainian) and a diminutive Kiro (common in the Balkan Sprachbund).

Saint Cyril of Jerusalem was a 4th-century bishop and a Doctor of the Church. Saint Cyril of Alexandria was a 5th-century theologian. Another Saint Cyril, known as Kiril, was a 9th-century translator and a Byzantine missionary to the Slavs. He, together with his brother Methodius, created an alphabet called the Glagolitic alphabet to serve the needs of the Slavic world, translating the Bible into the Church Slavic language. Later, their students created a simpler and graphically usable script, which is named after Cyril as the Cyrillic alphabet and is still used by millions of people.

== People with the name ==
- Kiril Džajkovski, Macedonian musician
- Kiril Juha Kainulainen, Finnish photographer
- Kiril Kavadarkov, Bulgarian actor
- Kirill Pokrovsky, Russian/Belgian Composer
- Kiryl Tarasenka, Belarusian Aeronautical Engineer
- Kiril Petkov, Bulgarian politician
- Kiril Valchev, Bulgarian journalist
- Kiril, Prince of Preslav

== See also ==
- Kirill
- Kyril
- Cyril
