= Herbert Rose Barraud =

English photographer (1845–1896)

- Born: 24 August 1845; Camberwell, London, England
- Died: 1896 (aged 50–51); St Mary Cray, London, England
- Occupation: Photographer
- Children: Cyril Henry Barraud
- Father: Henry Barraud
- Relatives: Francis Barraud (brother); William Barraud (uncle)

Signature
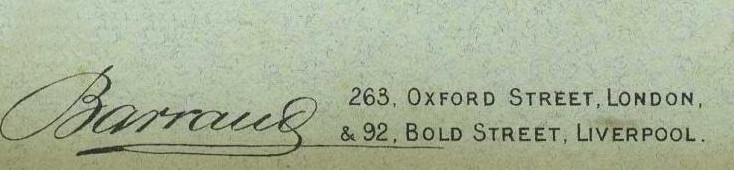

Herbert Rose Barraud (24 August 1845 – 27 November 1896) was an English portrait photographer who had studios in London and Liverpool.

== Career ==
Between 1873 and 1880 Barraud had a partnership, Barraud & Jerrard, with George Milner Gibson Jerrard (1848–1918). He produced cabinet photographs of many famous Victorian statesmen, artists, and members of the aristocracy, many of which were published in his two-volume work, Men and Women of the Day, 1888–89.

Most of Barraud's images were Woodburytypes, then a newly developed process which lent itself admirably to portraiture, being able to render middle tones accurately.

Barraud's studios were at 96 Gloucester Place, Portman Square in 1883, at 263 Oxford Street ("A few doors west of 'The Circus'") between 1883 and 1891, at 73 Piccadilly from 1893 to 1896, and at 126 Piccadilly in 1897. Another studio was located at 92 Bold Street, Liverpool.

== Personal life ==
Herbert Barraud's brother was Francis Barraud (1856–1924), an artist celebrated for having created "His Master's Voice", a painting used globally as an entertainment trademark for sound equipment, record labels and retail stores. His father was the painter Henry Barraud; his son Cyril Henry Barraud was also an artist.

== Selected works ==
Media related to Herbert Rose Barraud at Wikimedia Commons

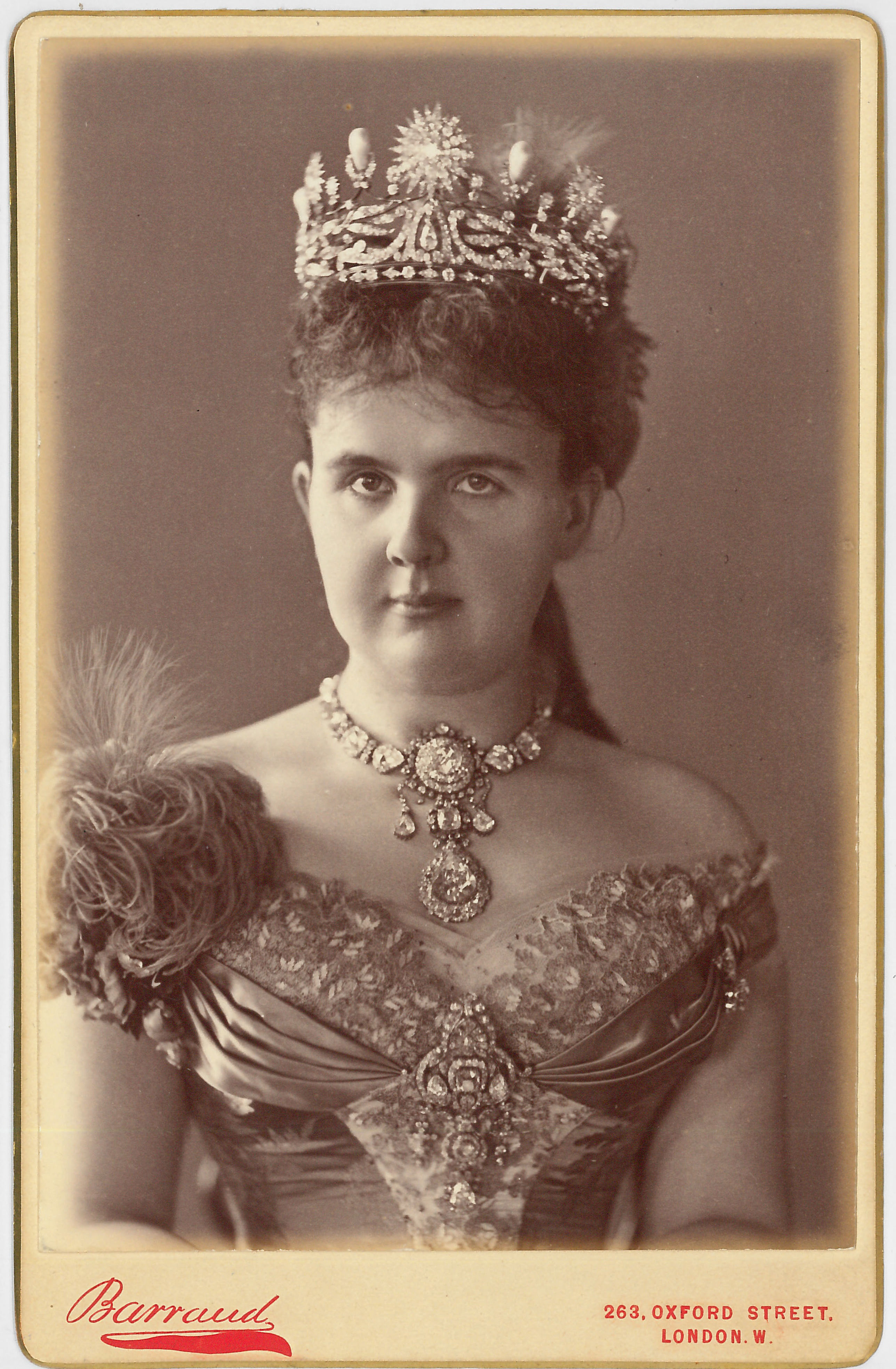
Emma van Waldecck-Pyrmont, 1882

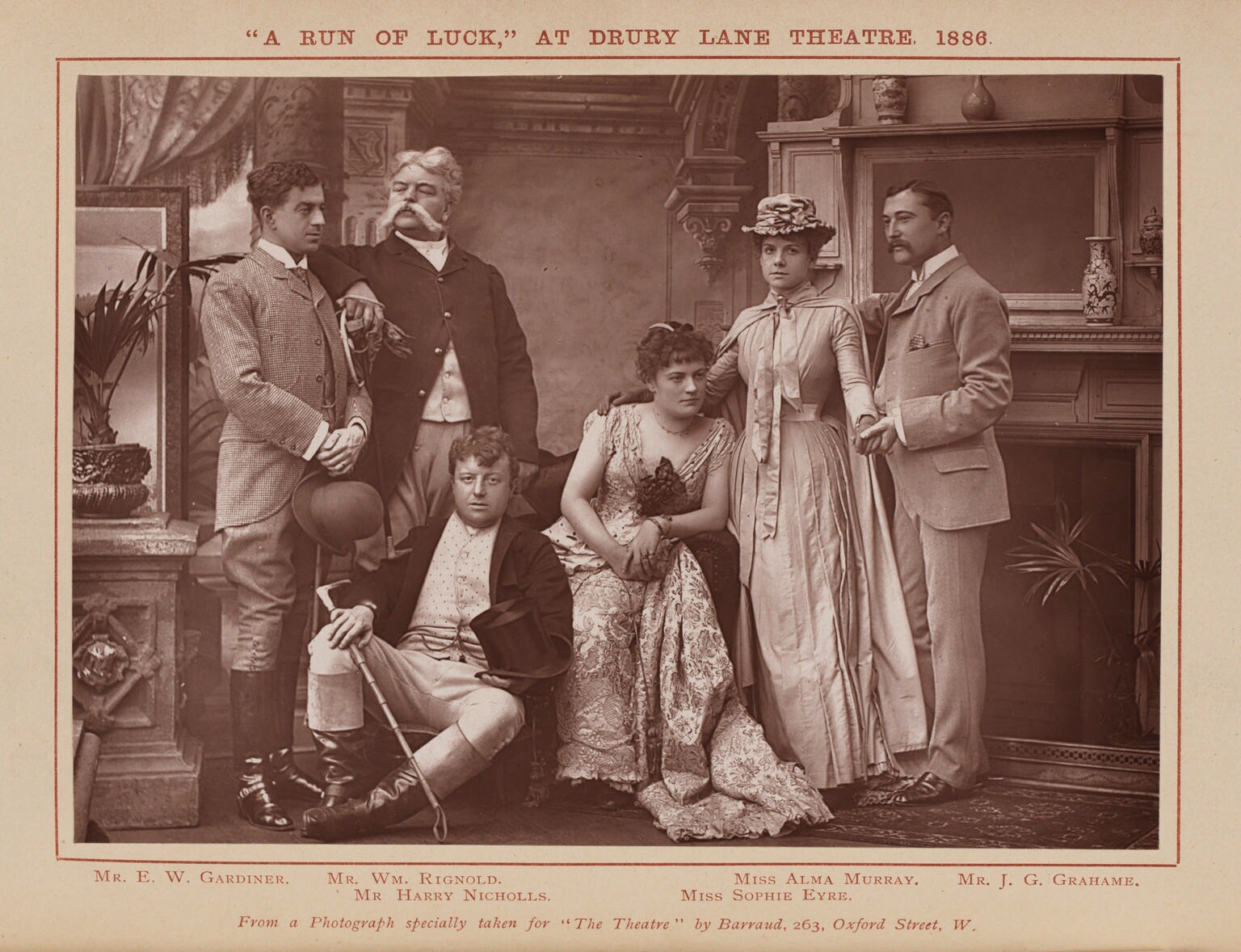
A Run of Luck at the Drury Lane Theatre, 1886

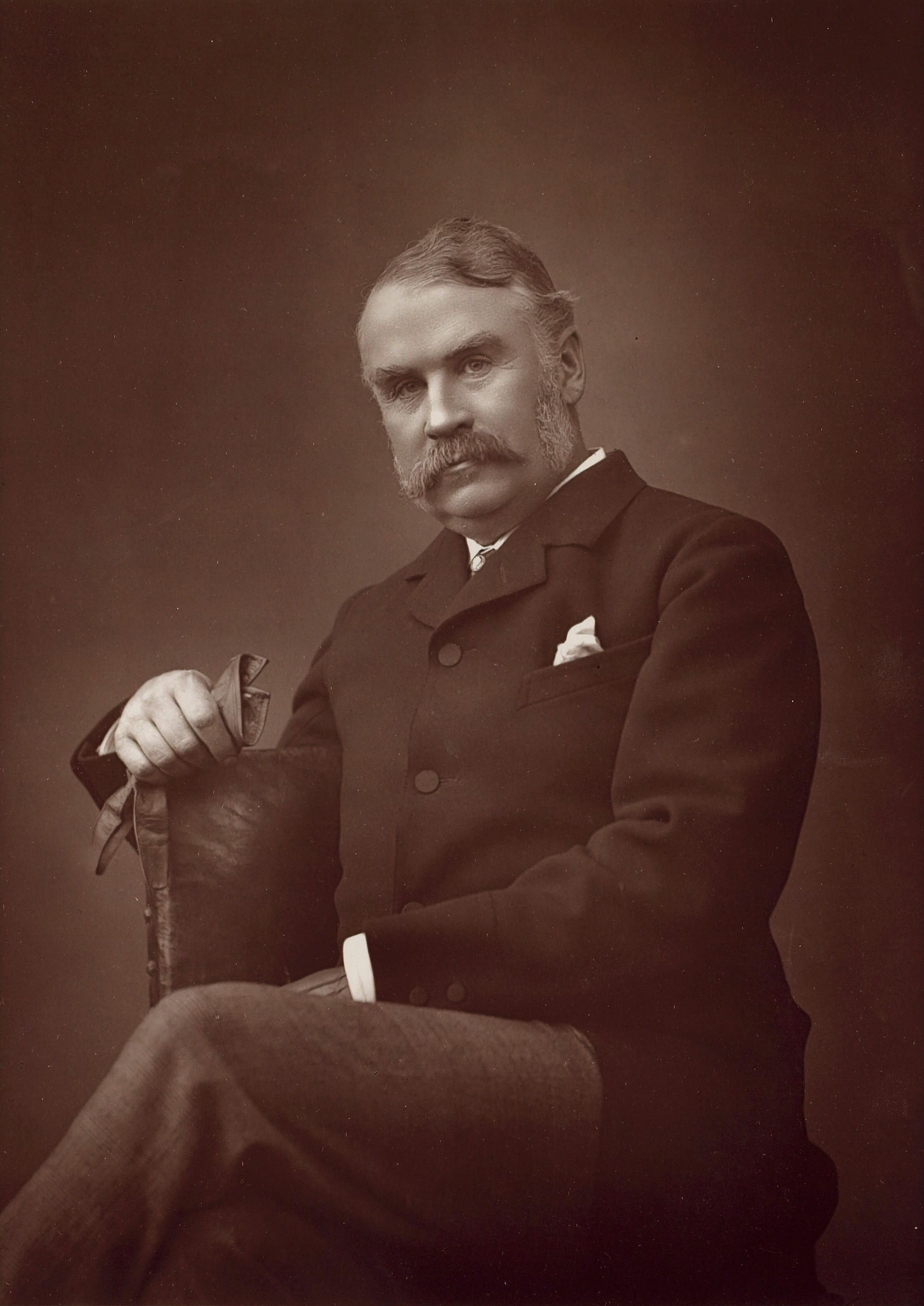
Photograph of W. S. Gilbert, late 1880s

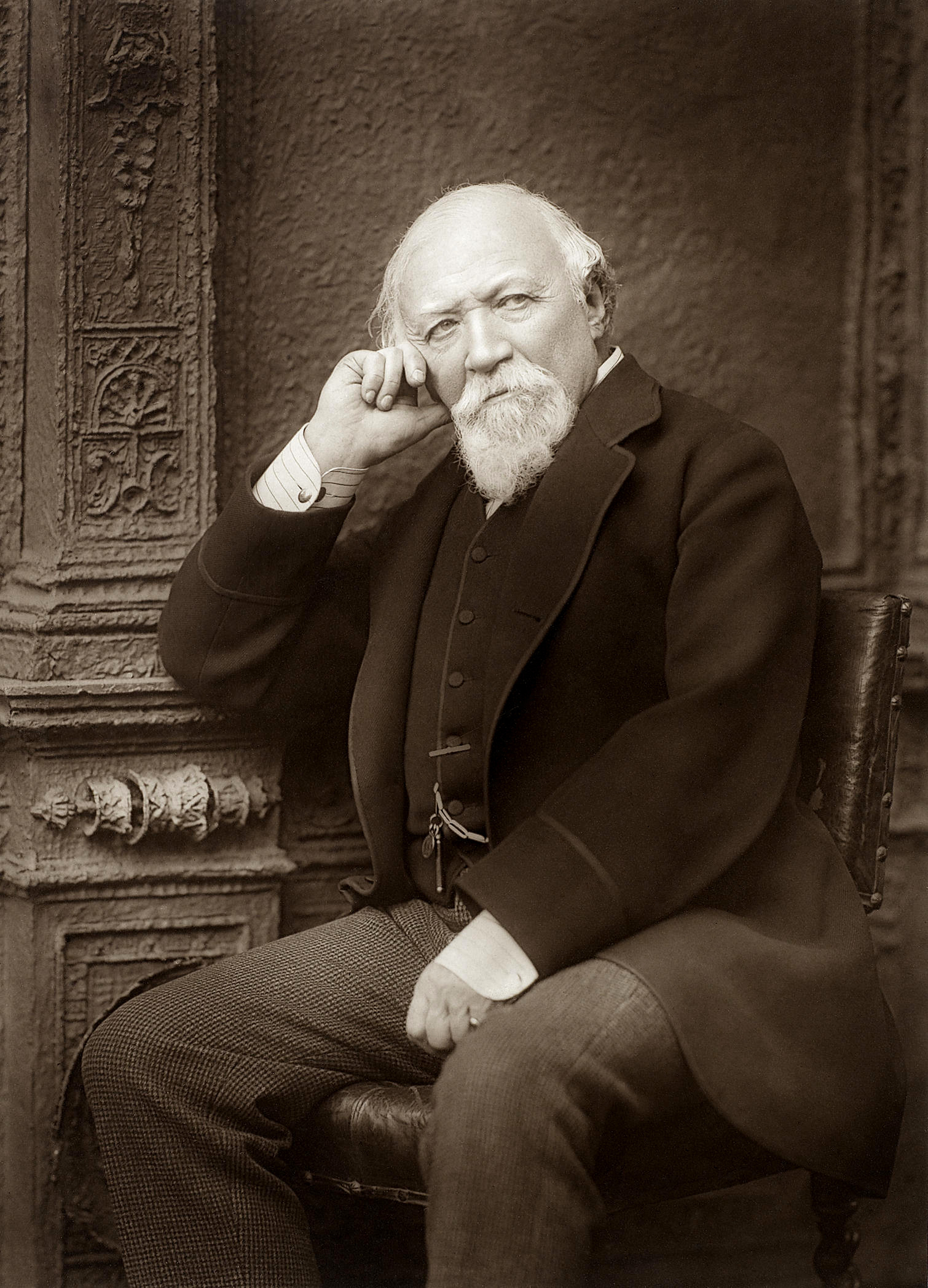
Robert Browning, circa 1888
