= Cyrill Gasser =

Swiss footballer (born 1992)

Personal information
- Full name: Cyrill Gasser
- Date of birth: 11 March 1992 (age 34)
- Place of birth: Switzerland
- Position: Left midfielder

Team information
- Current team: FC Schötz
- Number: 23

Senior career*
Years	Team	Apps	(Gls)
2010–2011	SC Buochs	28	(4)
2012–2015	SC Cham	29	(1)
2012–2014	FC Thun	2	(0)
2014–2019	SC Cham	118	(0)
2019–	FC Schötz	1	(0)
- * Club domestic league appearances and goals as of 22:33, 8 August 2019 (UTC)

Cyrill Gasser (born 11 March 1992) is a Swiss footballer who plays as midfielder. He used to play for FC Schötz in the Swiss 1. Liga.

== Career ==
In the 2010/11 season, Gasser played for SC Buochs.

Ahead of the 2019/20 season, Gasser joined FC Schötz from SC Cham.
