= Ss. Athanasius and Cyrill Church =

Orthodox church in Iași, Romania

Coordinates: 47.1688°N 27.5857°E

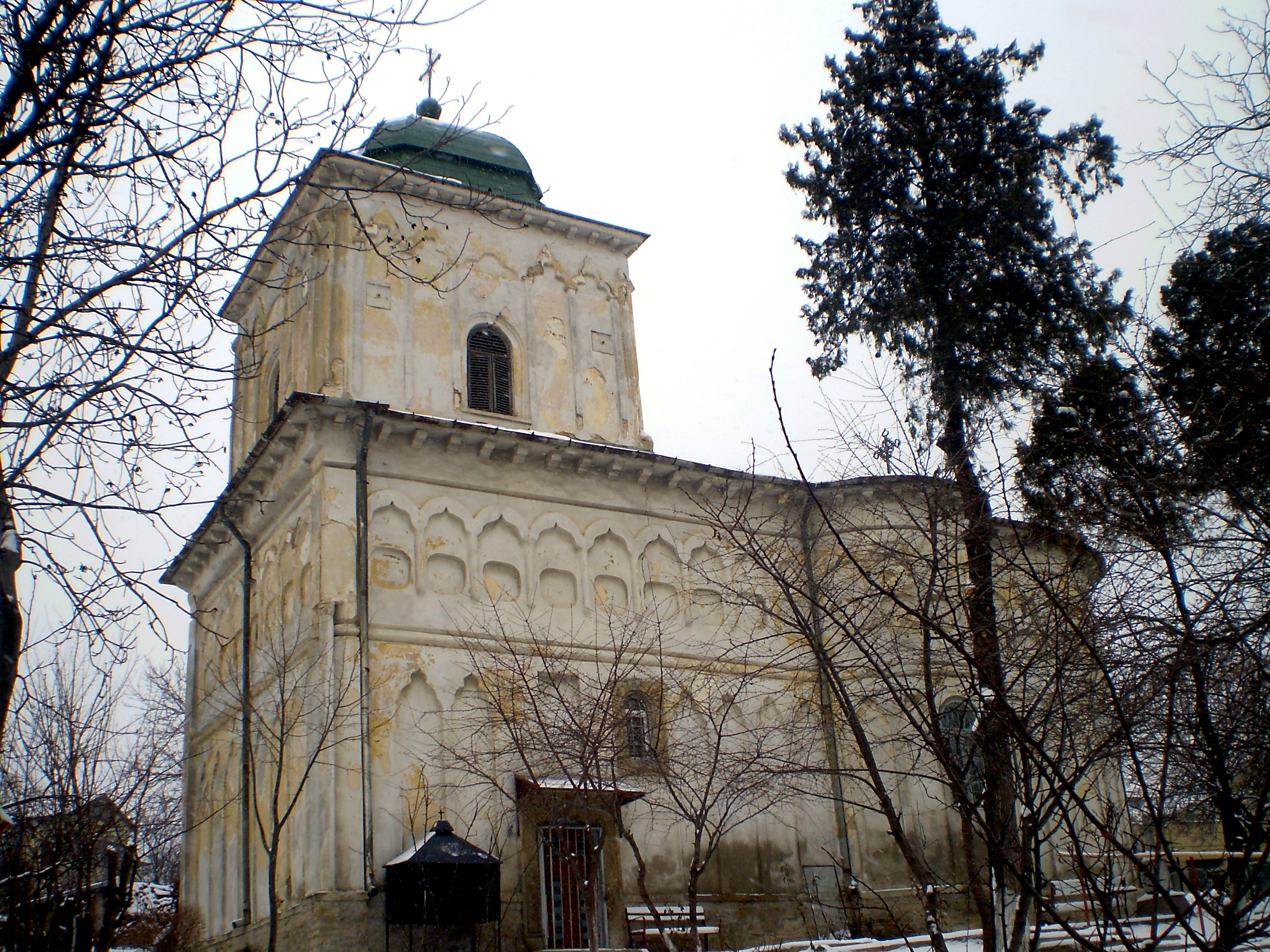
Ss. Athanasius and Cyrill Church

Ss. Athanasius and Cyrill Church (Romanian: Biserica Sfinții Atanasie și Chiril) is a Romanian Orthodox church located at 20 Sfântul Atanasie Street in Iași, Romania. It is dedicated to Saints Athanasius of Alexandria and Cyril of Alexandria.

The church was built from 1672 to 1674; historian Gheorghe Ghibănescu asserts that Prince Ștefan Petriceicu made contributions. An unconfirmed legend states that the builder was the former Patriarch Nectarius of Jerusalem. The ktitor has not been established; it may have been Atanasie Patelaros, administrator of Greek monastic properties in Moldavia.

The building was seriously damaged by fire in 1822 and 1844, and by bombardments during World War II in 1941 and 1944. The 1977 Vrancea earthquake also caused damage, making new repairs necessary. The Vulpe Church was its filial for a time, and its priests served there between 1972 and 1997, when the building was closed. A cemetery functioned in the graveyard until 1946, when it was closed and all the headstones removed. Since 1997, the church serves as a chapel for the Orthodox women's society and for the nearby tuberculosis hospital.

The church was built outside the old city walls, in a place known as the paupers' cemetery. Atop the vestibule, it has a single massive square spire, with five bells inside. Trefoil in shape, it has a foyer, vestibule, nave and altar; it is in the usual Moldavian style. The exterior walls are plastered and decorated with pilasters on two levels, one deep and the other in relief. Gheorghe Balș noted the prettiness of the iconostasis. The entrance is to the south. Today, the interior walls are not painted, merely decorated with icons, but they appear to have been painted in 1855 by an artist from Sibiu. The church's valuables include two large 18th-century bells; a chalice from 1856; a silvered icon of the Virgin Mary from 1845; and 18th-century church books in Old Church Slavonic, Greek, and Romanian Cyrillic. An 1847 icon of Sabbas the Sanctified was brought by the donor from Mar Saba in 1905. The icon of the church's painters is also of note, old and decorated in silver. In 1854, the first church choir in Moldavia was established here, after the Russian model. It was active for nearly six years, until the death of its founder, aga Evdochim Ianov; the initial director was Gheorghe Burada.

The church is listed as a historic monument by Romania's Ministry of Culture and Religious Affairs.

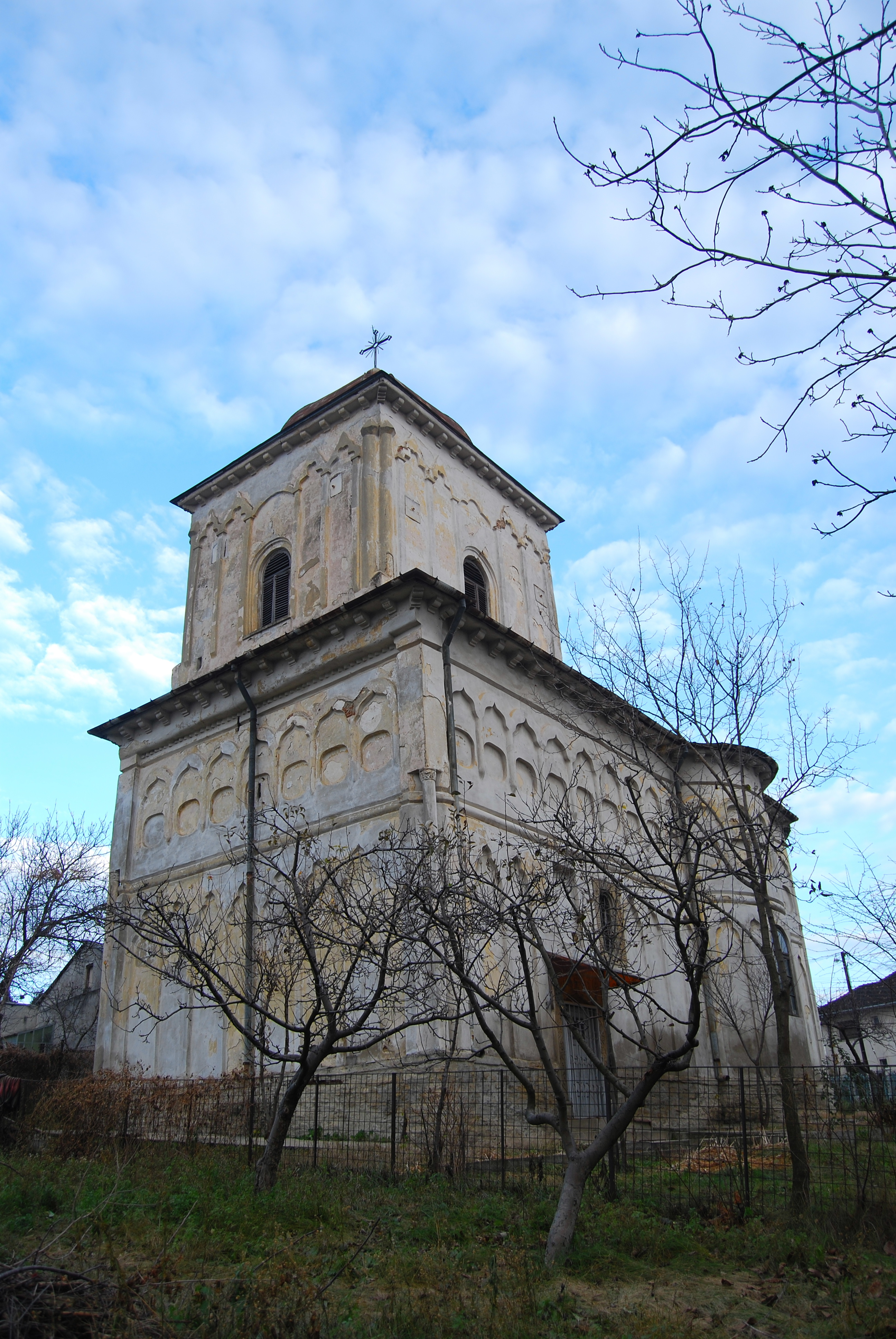
West end

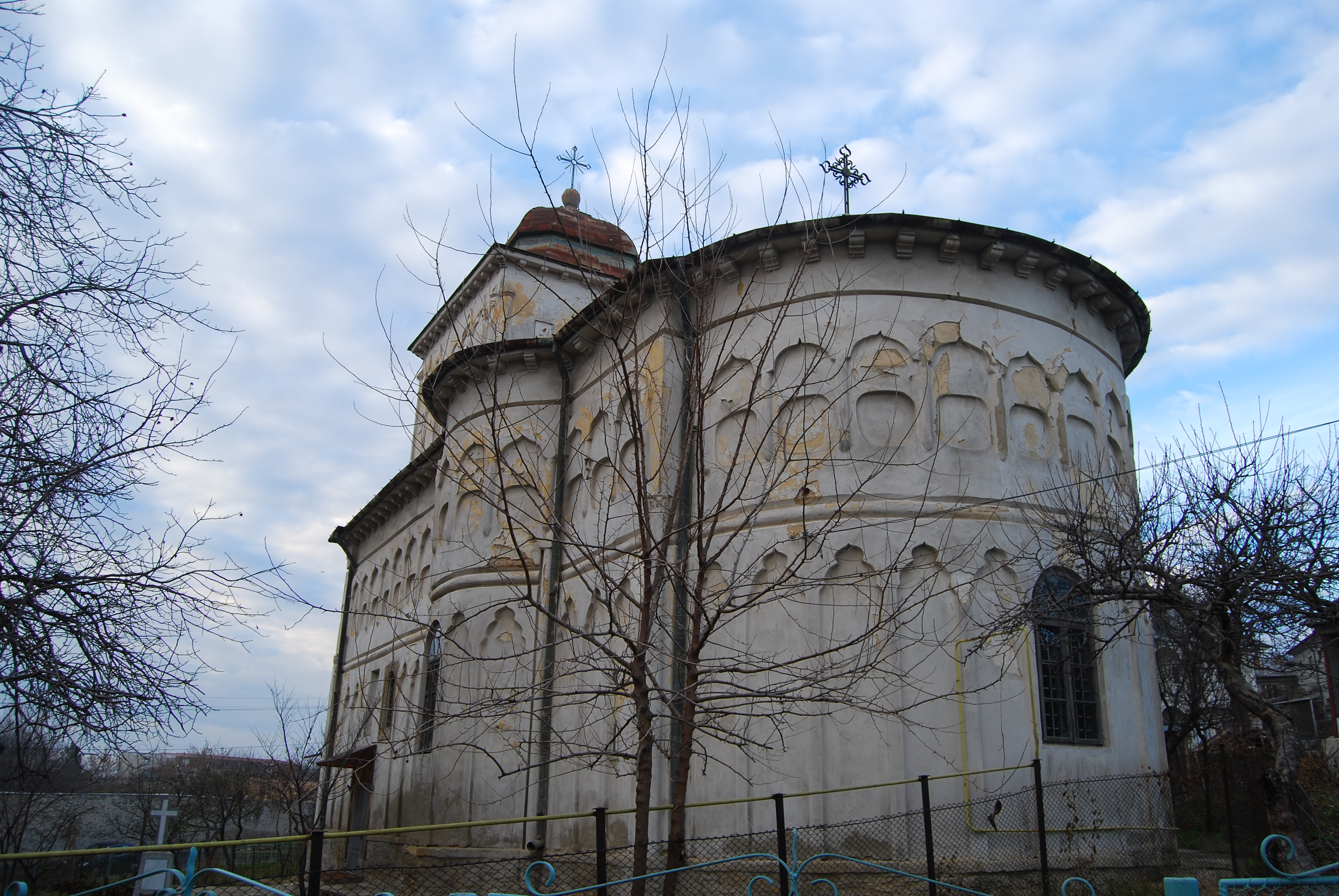
East end

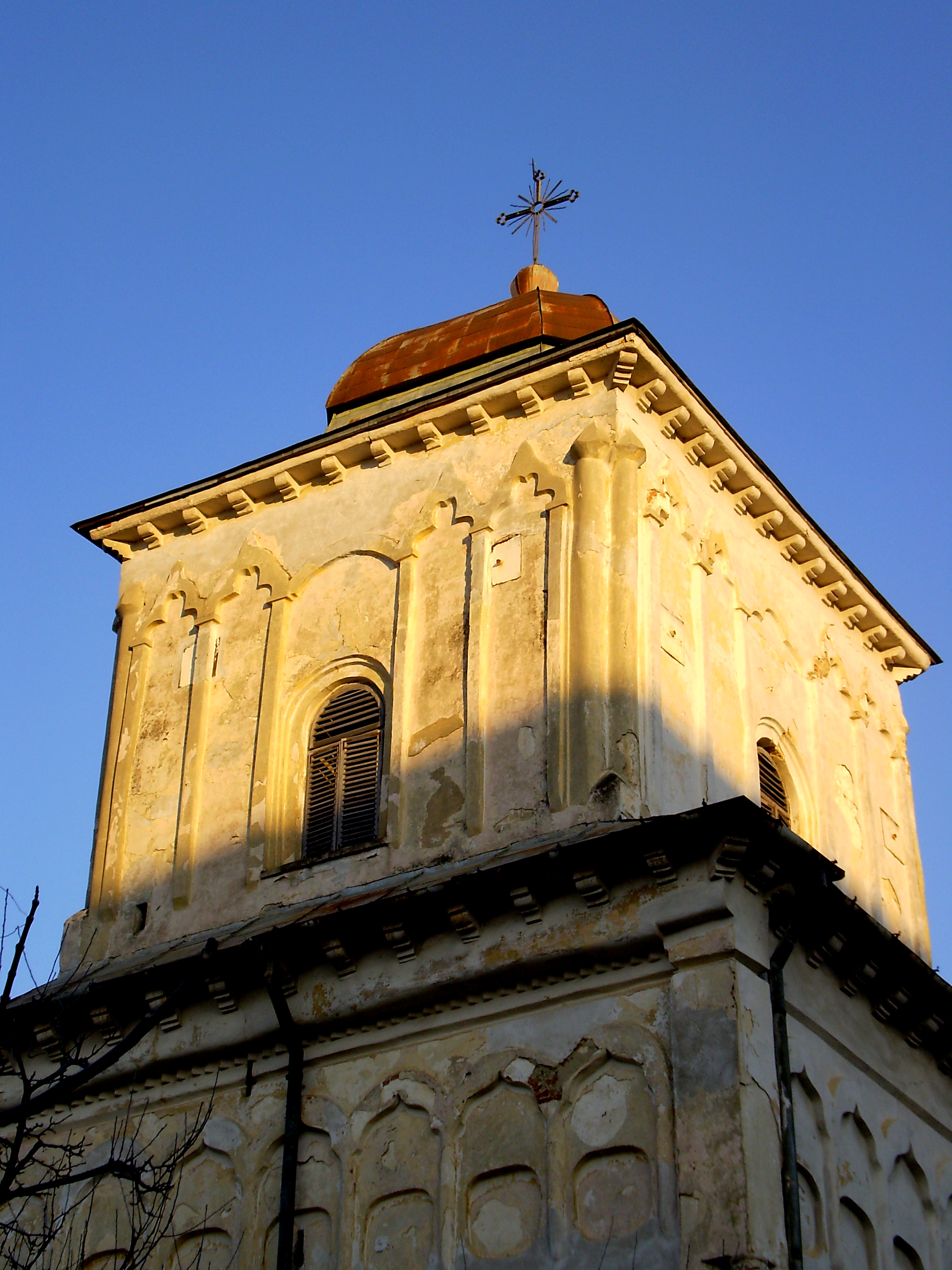
Spire
