= St. Cyril's Monastery =

St. Cyril's Monastery may refer to:

- St. Cyril's Monastery (Kyiv), a former monastery in Kyiv, Ukraine (from which a single church survives)
- St. Cyril's Monastery (Russia), Europe's largest monastery in terms of area
- St. Cyril's Monastery, a fictional monastery in James Bond film For Your Eyes Only, which was filmed at the Monastery of the Holy Trinity in Greece
