= Kyrylo Bohatenko =

Ukrainian footballer

Personal information
- Date of birth: 15 April 1988 (age 38)
- Height: 1.81 m (5 ft 11 1/2 in)
- Position: Midfielder

Senior career*
Years	Team	Apps	(Gls)
2007–2008	Academia UTM Chişinău	7	(3)
2008	→ Dynamo Bryansk (loan)	6	(0)
- * Club domestic league appearances and goals

Kyrylo Bohatenko (Russian: Кирилл Богатенко; born 15 April 1988) is a Ukrainian footballer.

== Career ==
Bohatenko played one season for FC Academia UTM Chişinău. He was signed by Russian First Division side FC Dynamo Bryansk in March 2008.
