= Xunwu County =

Xunwu 寻乌县 Sunwu
- County
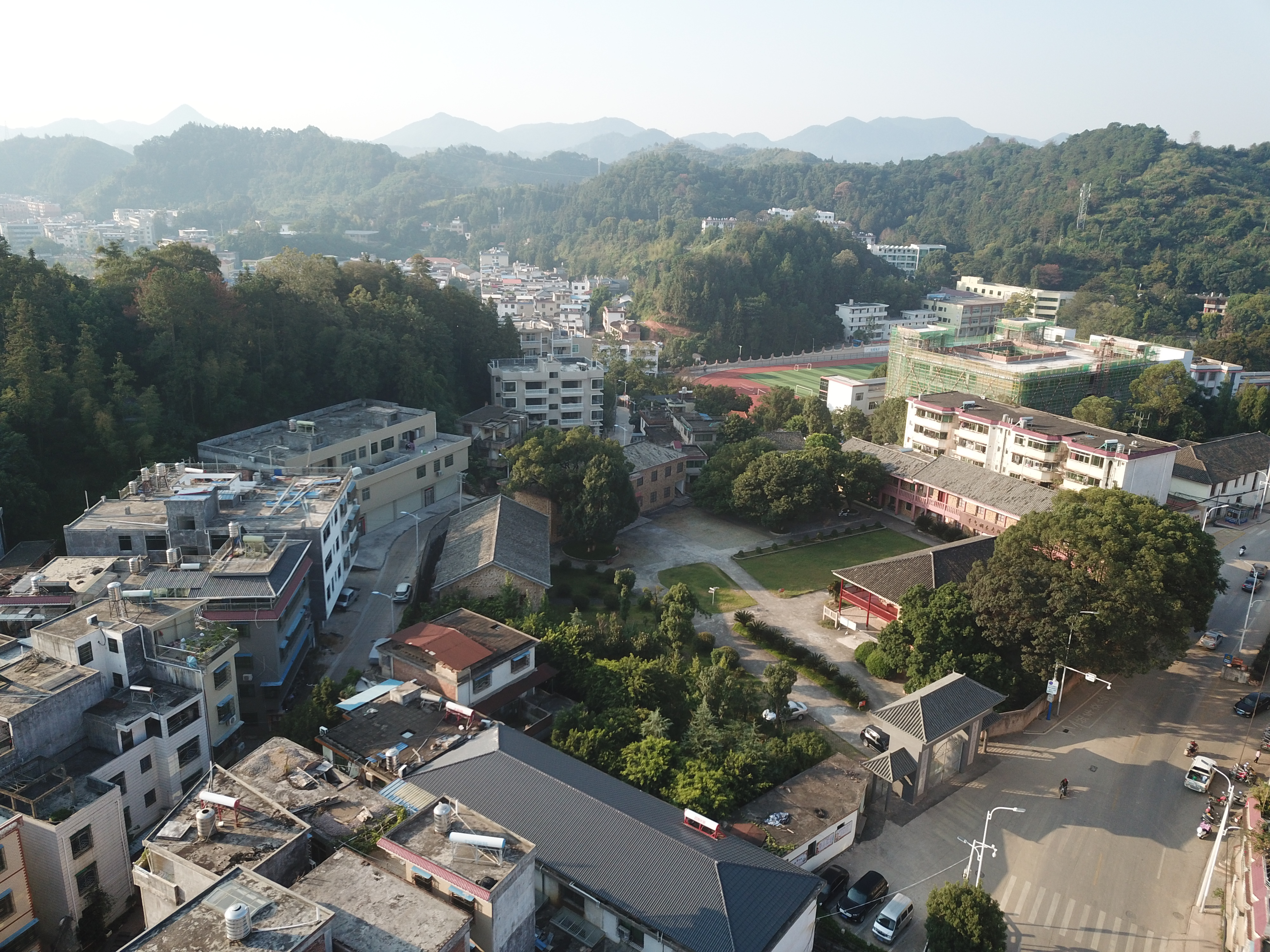

- Location in Jiangxi
- Coordinates: 24°57′47″N 115°38′49″E
- Country: People's Republic of China
- Province: Jiangxi
- Prefecture-level city: Ganzhou

Area
  - Total: 2,351 km^{2} (908 sq mi)

Population
  - Total: 331,934 (registered population in 2,018)
  - Density: 141/km^{2} (370/sq mi)
- Postal Code: 342200

Xunwu County (simplified Chinese: 寻乌县; traditional Chinese: 尋烏縣; pinyin: Xúnwū Xiàn) is a county in the far south of Jiangxi province, People's Republic of China, bordering the provinces of Fujian to the east and Guangdong to the south. It is under the administration of the prefecture-level city of Ganzhou.

It was the focus of Mao Zedong's 1930 essay Report from Xunwu which surveyed conditions in the region and related them to Mao's developing theory of Chinese communism.

== Administrative divisions ==
Xunwu County has seven towns and eight townships.

=== Towns ===
The seven towns of Xunwu County are:

- Changning (长宁镇)
- Chenguang (晨光镇)
- Liuche (留车镇)
- Nanqiao (南桥镇)
- Jitan (吉潭镇)
- Chengjiang (澄江镇)
- Guizhumao (桂竹帽镇)

=== Townships ===
Xunwu County's eight townships are:

- Wenfeng (文峰乡)
- Sanbiao (三标乡)
- Changpu (菖蒲乡)
- Longyan (龙延乡)
- Danxi (丹溪乡)
- Dingshan (顶山乡)
- Shuiyuan (水源乡)
- Luoshan (罗珊乡)

== Climate ==
Climate data for Xunwu, elevation 304 m (997 ft), (1991–2020 normals, extremes 1981–2010)
Month	Jan	Feb	Mar	Apr	May	Jun	Jul	Aug	Sep	Oct	Nov	Dec	Year
Record high °C (°F)	27.2 (81.0)	30.3 (86.5)	31.2 (88.2)	33.9 (93.0)	35.1 (95.2)	37.1 (98.8)	38.3 (100.9)	37.8 (100.0)	37.0 (98.6)	35.5 (95.9)	34.4 (93.9)	28.1 (82.6)	38.3 (100.9)
Mean daily maximum °C (°F)	15.2 (59.4)	17.2 (63.0)	19.9 (67.8)	24.8 (76.6)	28.3 (82.9)	30.7 (87.3)	32.9 (91.2)	32.6 (90.7)	30.6 (87.1)	27.0 (80.6)	22.4 (72.3)	17.1 (62.8)	24.9 (76.8)
Daily mean °C (°F)	9.5 (49.1)	11.8 (53.2)	14.9 (58.8)	19.9 (67.8)	23.4 (74.1)	25.9 (78.6)	27.3 (81.1)	26.8 (80.2)	25.0 (77.0)	21.0 (69.8)	16.2 (61.2)	11.0 (51.8)	19.4 (66.9)
Mean daily minimum °C (°F)	5.8 (42.4)	8.2 (46.8)	11.5 (52.7)	16.3 (61.3)	20.0 (68.0)	22.7 (72.9)	23.4 (74.1)	23.2 (73.8)	21.2 (70.2)	16.7 (62.1)	11.8 (53.2)	6.8 (44.2)	15.6 (60.1)
Record low °C (°F)	−5.0 (23.0)	−2.4 (27.7)	−2.7 (27.1)	5.1 (41.2)	10.6 (51.1)	14.6 (58.3)	18.0 (64.4)	18.0 (64.4)	11.7 (53.1)	5.2 (41.4)	−1.6 (29.1)	−5.3 (22.5)	−5.3 (22.5)
Average precipitation mm (inches)	64.6 (2.54)	89.7 (3.53)	167.1 (6.58)	187.7 (7.39)	238.4 (9.39)	264.9 (10.43)	162.3 (6.39)	188.0 (7.40)	100.9 (3.97)	43.4 (1.71)	52.9 (2.08)	48.1 (1.89)	1,608 (63.3)
Average precipitation days (≥ 0.1 mm)	8.9	11.4	17.4	16.7	17.3	18.8	15.0	17.1	11.2	5.5	6.8	7.2	153.3
Average snowy days	0.4	0.3	0	0	0	0	0	0	0	0	0	0.2	0.9
Average relative humidity (%)	76	79	82	82	83	84	80	82	80	74	75	73	79
Mean monthly sunshine hours	110.9	91.2	81.0	94.2	114.4	128.1	206.1	188.2	171.2	172.8	150.3	140.6	1,649
Percentage possible sunshine	33	28	22	25	28	31	49	47	47	49	46	43	37
Source: China Meteorological Administration
