= Edwin Cyril Geddes Barrett =

British colonial administrator (1909-1986)

Edwin Cyril Geddes Barrett CMG

British Adviser, Kedah
- In office 1953–1957
- Preceded by: Arthur Bawtree Cobden-Ramsay
- Succeeded by: Post abolished

Personal details
- Born: 15 February 1909
- Died: 1986 (aged 76–77)
- Spouse: Eleanor Nelson Raymond
- Children: 1 son
- Education: Jesus College, Cambridge
- Occupation: Colonial administrator

Edwin Cyril Geddes Barrett CMG (15 February 1909 – 1986) was a British colonial administrator who served as the last British Adviser of Kedah from 1954 to 1957.

== Early life and education ==
Barrett was born on 15 February 1909, the son of Colonel C.C.J. Barrett. He was educated at Marlborough College and Jesus College, Cambridge.

== Career ==
In 1931, Barrett joined the Malay civil service as a cadet, beginning his career as secretary to the British Adviser, Kedah. For the next eleven years, he served in many posts in Malaya and Borneo. During World War Two he performed military service, and after the war rejoined the Malay civil service.

In 1949, he was appointed Chief Registration Officer, Federation of Malaya, in 1951 he was President of the Municipal Council of Kuala Lumpur, and the following year he was appointed Commissioner for Resettlement of Special Constables in Civilian Life, Federation of Malaya.

In 1953, he was appointed Acting British Adviser, Perak and a member of the Perak State Council, but was transferred later the same year to the post of British Adviser, Kedah, remaining in the position until 1957 when the post was abolished.

He retired from the Malay civil service in 1957 and became a lecturer in the Malay language at the School of Oriental and African Studies, University of London.

He retired in 1971, and died in 1986.

== Personal life ==
Barrett married Eleanor Nelson Raymond in 1936, and they had one son.

== Honours ==
Barrett was appointed Companion of the Order of St Michael and St George (CMG) in the 1958 Birthday Honours.
