= Cyril Lewis =

Welsh footballer

Personal information
- Full name: Arthur Cyril Lewis
- Date of birth: 10 April 1909
- Place of birth: Tonypandy, Wales
- Date of death: 1999 (aged 89–90)
- Height: 5 ft 8 in (1.73 m)
- Position: Winger

Senior career*
| Years | Team | Apps | (Gls) |
| 1929–1930 | Trealaw Rangers | | |
| 1930–1931 | Treorchy Juniors | | |
| 1931–1932 | Merthyr Town | | |
| 1932–1933 | Tranmere Rovers | 8 | (0) |
| 1933–1939 | Grimsby Town | 75 | (31) |
| 1939 | Plymouth Argyle | 0 | (0) |
- * Club domestic league appearances and goals

Arthur Cyril Lewis (10 April 1909 – 1999) was a Welsh professional footballer who played as a winger.
