= Cyril Briggs (footballer) =

English footballer

Personal information
- Full name: John Cyril Briggs
- Date of birth: 24 November 1918
- Place of birth: Lower Broughton, England
- Date of death: 26 November 1998 (aged 80)
- Place of death: Perth, Australia
- Position: Central defender

Senior career*
Years	Team	Apps	(Gls)
- Darwen
1940–1945	Manchester United		
1946–1950	Accrington Stanley	135	(1)
1950	Southport	3	(0)
1950–1951	Hyde United		
Total		138	(1)
- * Club domestic league appearances and goals

Cyril Briggs (24 November 1918 – 26 November 1998) was an English professional footballer who played as a central defender in the Football League.
