= Cyril Benoit =

French entrepreneur

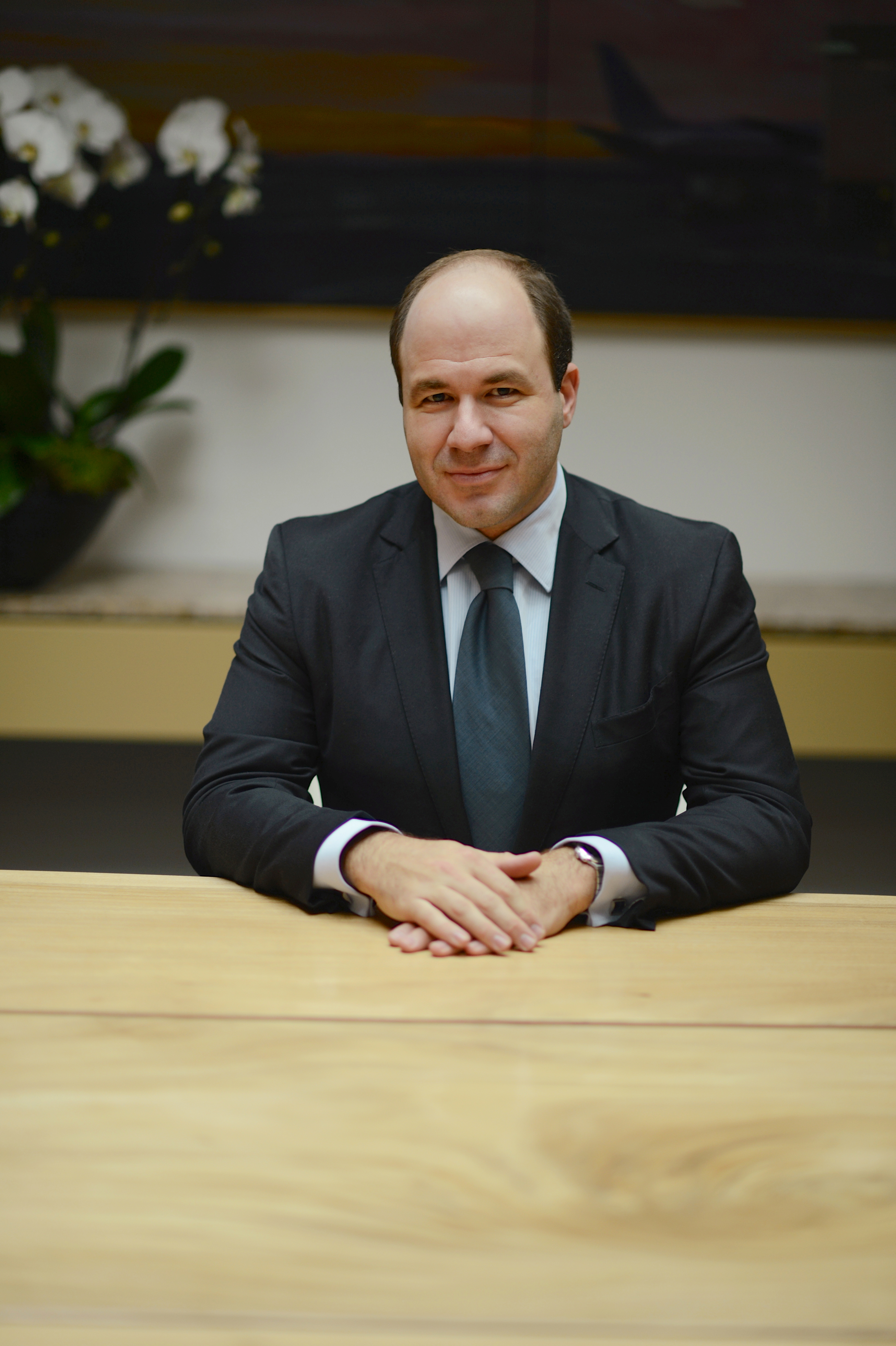
- Cyril Benoit, Président de Benoit & Associés
- Born: 1974 (age 51–52); Paris, France
- Occupation: French entrepreneur

Cyril Benoit (born 1974 in Paris) is a French entrepreneur specialized in cross-border transactions, founder and Chairman of B&A Investment Bankershttps://www.forbes.fr/politique/cyril-benoit-la-vie-cest-la-conquete-de-lautonomie/. He previously served the French administration in several senior positions. In 2013 and 2014, he was named amongst the most influential French young economical leaders by leading business newspapers.

== Career ==
After reading philosophy at the Ecole Normale Supérieure Lettres et Sciences Humaines and graduating from Paris IV-Sorbonne University, his penchant for public affairs propelled Cyril Benoit into the circles of public service until his interests veered to international investment and business.

In 1997, Cyril Benoit served as a speech writer to Former Prime minister Laurent Fabius, then President of the French Assemblée Nationale, and played a key role in the development of Fabius' brainstorming network. From 2000 to 2002, he worked within the private office of Laurent Fabius at the Ministry for Economy, Finance and Industry. In addition to this role, Cyril Benoit served as Deputy Chief of Staff, then Technical Advisor to the Minister of Industry, Christian Pierret.

Cyril Benoit also worked at the Office of Congressman Tom Lantos in Washington D.C, the California's Representative and Human Rights Caucus' Chairman (relabelled Tom Lantos Human Rights Commission after his founder died in 2008).

During his tenure at the Direction du Trésor (French Treasury Department) in 2002 and 2003, he was entrusted with the organization of the French Presidencies of the G7 and G8, and acted as the lead coordinator for the Indian and Mexican presidencies of the G20 and the Asia-Europe Meeting (ASEM). Cyril Benoit also contributed to the setting-up of the Agence des Participations de l'Etat (French Government Shareholding Agency), collaborating with Mr. Jean-Pierre Jouyet, currently Chief of Staff to French President François Hollande.

In 2003, Cyril joined Léon Bressler, UNIBAIL's CEO, as Special Project Manager. A former banker, Bressler mentored him to make his way into investment and global business. Cyril Benoit was instrumental into several high-profile transactions such as the Unibail-Rodamco merger, which founded the leading pan-European real estate listed company.

Following a number of key positions at Unibail such as Head of Corporate Development, then Chief Investment and Financial Officer of the Shopping Centre Division. In 2007, Cyril headed to London to participate during the financial turmoil in the creation of Perella Weinberg Real Estate, a 1, 2bn Euro real estate private equity fund.

== Distinctions ==
In 2013, French leading business paper Les Echos names him amongst the new generation of French leaders. In 2014, L'Opinion ranked him No. 5 in its Top 50 of the French "land seekers".

== Philanthropy ==
Cyril Benoit founded and chaired for several years Vouloir la République, a think–thank which Fondation Saint-Simon praised, in reviewing the commitment to politics of young people in their 30s, as the think–tank most intent on the necessity of achieving the in-depth insight advocated by many of its members.

Cyril Benoit is also a founding member and board member of the France-Israël Foundation, an official recognized non-profit organization initiated by Jacques Chirac and Ariel Sharon.

In July 2012, he was elected to the supervisory board of the Aspen Institute France and become its chairman in June 2013 until February 2015.
