= Kyrylo Myzgin =

- Born: 1983 (age 42–43); Kharkiv

Academic background
- Education: V. N. Karazin Kharkiv National University
- Thesis: Ancient coins on the sites of the Chernyakhiv Culture (2010)

Academic work
- Discipline: Archaeology, Numismatics
- Institutions: V. N. Karazin Kharkiv National University; University of Warsaw

Head of Department of Numismatics and Museology University of Warsaw

Kyrylo Myzgin (born 1983) is a Ukrainian archaeologist and numismatist. Since 2023, Myzgin has been head of the Laboratory of Eastern European Archaeology and since 2025 head of the Department of Numismatics and Museology (Katedra Numizmatyki i Muzealnictwa) at the University of Warsaw.

== Education ==
Myzgin completed his Master of Arts in history in 2005 at the V. N. Karazin Kharkiv National University. In 2010 he received his doctorate from the V. N. Karazin Kharkiv National University with his thesis on "Ancient coins on the sites of the Chernyakhiv Culture" (Russian Античные монеты на памятниках черняховской культуры). In 2023, he was awarded his habilitation at the University of Warsaw with the thesis "Eastern Barbaricum between the Roman and the Migration Periods in the light of numismatic sources" (Polish Wschodnie Barbaricum na przełomie okresu rzymskiego i Wędrówek Ludów w świetle źródeł numizmatycznych).

== Career ==
Myzgin taught as a docent at the V. N. Karazin Kharkiv National University from 2010 to 2015. This was followed by an appointment as associate professor at the University of Warsaw. He has worked there since 2015 and was an associate professor in the Department of Numismatics and Museology from 2021 to 2024 and has headed this department since 2025. Since 2023, he has also been the head of the Laboratory of Eastern European Archaeology at the University of Warsaw.

== Fellowships ==
- 2023 Heberden Coin Room East European Fellowship
- 2023 Dumbarton Oaks Summer Fellowship
- 2021-2023 Alexander von Humboldt Fellowship at Centre of Baltic and Scandinavian Archaeology
- 2018 Fuga-4 (NCN) Scholarship
- 2014 Kraay Travel Scholarship, Heberden Coin Room

== Honors ==
- 2023 Corresponding Member of the German Archaeological Institute
- 2013 Vasyl Karazin Prize (V. N. Karazin Kharkiv National University)
- 2008 Yevhen Kushnariov Prize (V. N. Karazin Kharkiv National University)

== Publications ==
A selection of his publications is given below:

- ed. (with Bartecki, Bartłomiej and Hyrchała, Anna). Skarb z Cichobórza: studia nad depozytem rzymskich denarów oraz ich naśladownictw = The Cichobórz hoard: a study of the deposit of Roman denarii and their imitations. Muzeum im. ks. Stanisława Staszica w Hrubieszowie, 2023. ISBN 978-83-949902-9-9
- ed. (with Kokowski, Andrzej et al.). Corpus der römischen Funde im europäischen Barbaricum. Bd. 6: Polen. Krajna (mit Randgebiet-von der Brda bis zur Weichsel). Polska Akademia Umiejętności ; Uniwersytet Marii Skłodowskiej-Curie w Lublinie. Instytut Archeologii ; Uniwersytet Jagielloński. Instytut Archeologii ; Uniwersytet Warszawski. Wydział Archeologii, 2023. ISBN 978-83-7676-368-2
- Myzgin, Kyrylo. Roman Republican Coins and Their Imitations from the Territory of Ukraine and Belarus. Warsaw University Press, 2017. DOI.org (Crossref), https://doi.org/10.31338/uw.9788323527282. ISBN 978-83-235-2728-2
- ed. (with Michail Vasilijevič Ljubičev. Inter Orientem et Occidentem: Sammelband zum 65. Geburtstag von Frau Doktor Erdmute Schultze und 20 Jahre der Germanisch-Slawischen archäologischen Expedition. Ostrogothica-Serie 3. Kharkiv 2020. ISBN 978-966-285-666-8
- Myzgin, Kyrylo. „The “Second Life” of Ancient Coins in Eastern Europe in the Middle Ages and the Modern Period“. In Slivers of Antiquity, pages 113-158. Warszawa: University of Warsaw Press, 2020.
- Myzgin, Kyrylo. The hoard from Zbuzh. In: Degler, Adam (ed.). The Collection of Ancient Coins in Lviv Historical Museum: = Kolekcija Antyčnych Monet u L’vivs’komu Istoryčnomu Muzeï = Zbiór Monet Antycznych w Lwowskim Muzeum Historycznym, pages 367-392 Wrocław: Yellowstone Publications, 2023.
- Myzgin, Kyrylo. The hoard from Oliiv. In: Degler, Adam (ed.). The Collection of Ancient Coins in Lviv Historical Museum: = Kolekcija Antyčnych Monet u L’vivs’komu Istoryčnomu Muzeï = Zbiór Monet Antycznych w Lwowskim Muzeum Historycznym, pages 335-346 Wrocław: Yellowstone Publications, 2023.
- Myzgin, Kyrylo. „New Finds of Gold Coins of Magnentius from Ukraine: The Short Report / Nowe znaleziska złotych monet Magnencjusza z Ukrainy. Krótkie doniesienie“. Notae Numismaticae - Numismatic Notes, Nr. 17, August 2023, pasges 199-219. DOI.org (Crossref), https://doi.org/10.52800/ajst.1.17.a8.
- Myzgin, Kyrylo. Late Roman period gold foil pendants stamped with anthropomorphic and zoomorphic ornaments from the Barbaricum. In: Pesch, Alexandra et al. (ed.). Gold Foil Figures in Focus: A Scandinavian Find Group and Related Objects and Images from Ancient and Medieval Europe. Papers from an International and Interdisciplinary Workshop Organized by the Centre for Baltic and Scandinavian Archaeology (ZBSA) in Schleswig, Schloss Gottorf, October 23rd-25th 2017, pages 255-278, München 2019. ISBN 978-3-89937-249-6
- Dymowski, Arkadiusz. „Roman Imperial Hoards of Denarii from the European Barbaricum“. In Group and Individual Tragedies in Roman Europe : the evidence of hoards, epigraphic and literary sources (2020), pages 193-243. Cluj-Napoca: Editura Mega, 2020.
- (with Arkadiusz Dymowski, und Oleksiy Chemuranov). „Typical Features of a Roman Imperial Denarius Hoard from the Chernyakhiv Culture Territory – The Case of the Skypche Hoard from Ukraine." Journal of Ancient History and Archaeology 7, 359-383. https://doi.org/10.14795/j.v7i1_SI.491.
- (with Vida, István and Więcek, Tomasz). Gold Imitations of Roman Coins from the Collection of Hungarian National Museum in Budapest. In Studia barbarica. Profesorowi Andrzejowi Kokowskiemu w 65 rocznicę urodzin = Studia barbarica : for Professor Andrzej Kokowski on his 65th birthday, Fasc. 2, 222-247. Lublin, 2018. ISBN 978-83-7825-043-2

List of publications available via academia.edu:

- Kyrylo Myzgin on academia.edu
