= Cyril Aures =

American politician

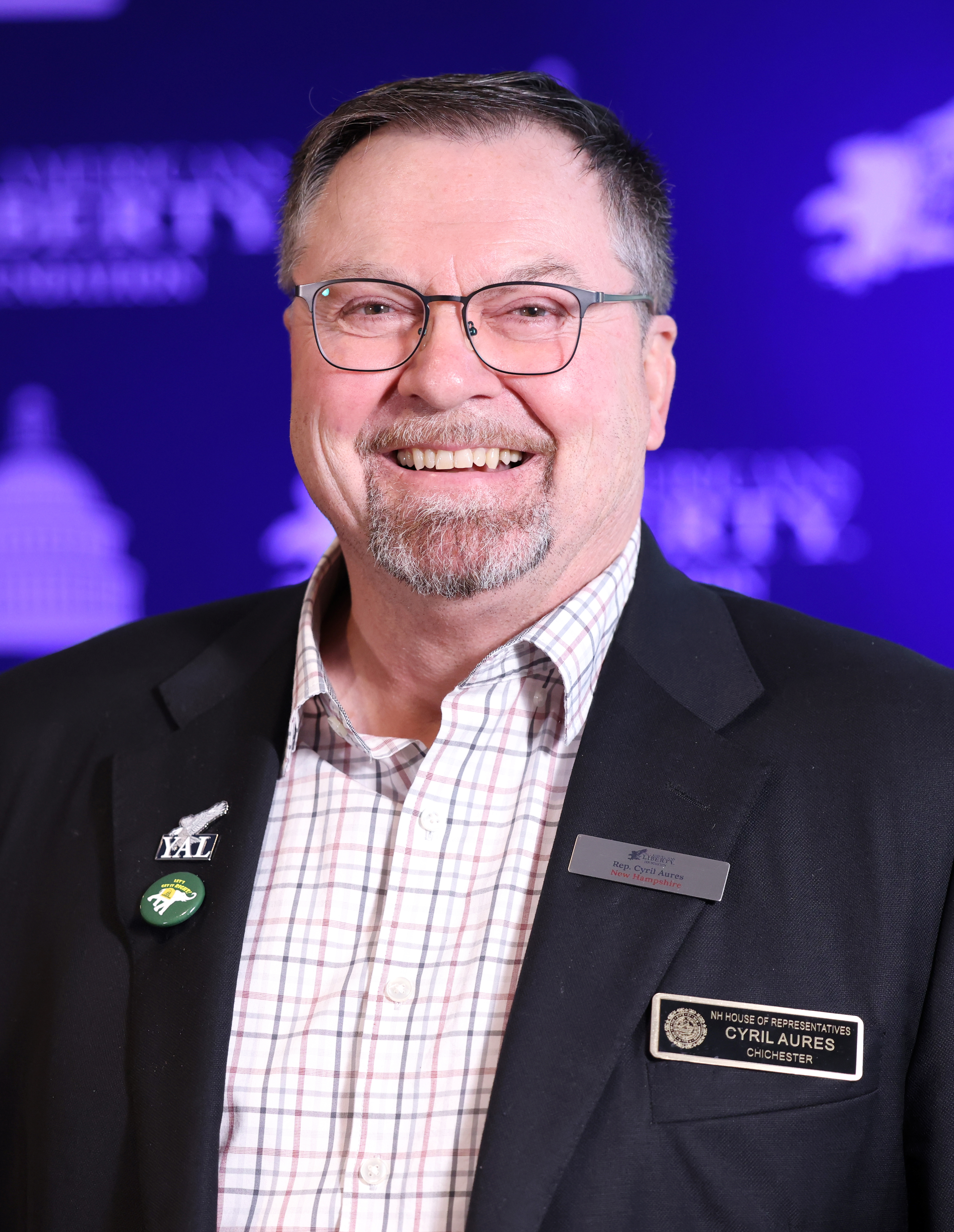
- Aures at the 2024 Hazlitt Summit hosted by Young Americans for Liberty Foundation

Member of the New Hampshire House of Representatives from the Merrimack 13th district
- Incumbent
- Assumed office December 7, 2022
- Succeeded by: Becky Berk (elect)

Personal details
- Party: Republican

Cyril Aures is an American politician. He serves as a Republican member for the Merrimack 13th district of the New Hampshire House of Representatives. He was defeated for re-election by independent Becky Berk in 2026.

== Controversies ==
In January 2026, Aures and fellow Republican state representative Clayton Wood walked out of a public forum on education policy in Pembroke after audience members questioned lawmakers about Republican support for education funding priorities. The event, organized by the Pembroke school board to foster dialogue between residents and legislators, became contentious as Aures challenged criticisms from attendees and ultimately left the session before it concluded. Observers at the event reacted strongly to the departure, and the walk-out was discussed in news coverage as an example of the challenges in bridging divides on education issues in the state.
