= Cyril Burke (Australian rules footballer) =

Australian rules footballer (1905–1984)

Personal information
- Full name: Cyril Ignatius Burke
- Born: 14 October 1905; Hawthorn, Victoria
- Died: 6 September 1984 (aged 78); Prahran, Victoria
- Original team: Old Xaverians

Playing career^{1}
Years	Club	Games (Goals)
1926	Richmond	2 (2)
- ^{1} Playing statistics correct to the end of 1926.

Cyril Ignatius Burke (14 October 1905 – 6 September 1984) was an Australian rules footballer who played with Richmond in the Victorian Football League (VFL).
