= Cyril Henry Barraud =

British artist

- Born: 1877
- Died: 1965 (aged 87–88)
- Occupation: Artist
- Father: Herbert Rose Barraud
- Relatives: Francis Barraud (uncle)

Cyril Henry Barraud (1877–1965) was a British artist. He was the son of Herbert Rose Barraud and nephew of Francis Barraud.

== Career ==
After education at Downside School, Barraud trained at the Brighton School of Art and then worked as a manager at his father's photographic business before becoming a full-time artist. Between 1912 and 1924, he exhibited at the Royal Academy of Arts. He was close to Francis Barraud and helped him with the final version of "His Master's Voice".

Barraud came to Canada in 1913, settling in Manitoba. One of Barraud's principal mediums was etching. In 1915, he taught Canadian artist Walter J. Phillips etching skills. During the First World War, Barraud was commissioned by The Queen's Own Cameron Highlanders of Canada (43 Battalion) and, after being wounded in the left leg, was posted to the Canadian War Office as an official war artist. An extensive collection of his wartime work is in the collection of the Canadian War Museum.

Barraud remained in England after the war. His work covers landscapes in Suffolk, Essex, Kent, the Thames Estuary and Rye. He also painted and etched:

- London street-scenes
- popular destinations close to the London and North Eastern Railway to be used as carriage prints
- cathedrals
- churches
- industrial buildings (notably interiors of Dunston Power Station)
- illustrations
- Christmas Cards

Barraud was married twice, first to Gladys Seanor (with whom he had two children) and, after her death, to Evelyn Dixon.
