= Cyril B. Busbee =

American educator (1908–2001)

Cyril B. Busbee (1908–2001) was an American educator who served as the 12th State Superintendent of Education in South Carolina from 1967 to 1979.

Cyril B. Busbee Elementary School is named after him.

== Biography ==
Born in Wagener, South Carolina, Busbee earned a bachelor's degree in 1928 and a master's degree in 1938, both from the University of South Carolina. He worked as a teacher, coach, and school administrator before he became superintendent of the Brookland-Cayce Schools, part of Lexington District Two.

Busbee assumed the role of state superintendent following the retirement of Jesse T. Anderson in 1966. He defeated Inez C. Eddings with 53 percent of the vote, facing a notable Republican challenge. Reelected in 1970 and 1974, he served during a period when federal desegregation guidelines required integration across South Carolina's schools. His administration introduced a statewide kindergarten system and expanded a free basic textbook program to all grades.

After retiring in 1979, Busbee worked as a consultant to the president of the University of South Carolina and served on the boards of C&S National Bank and Lexington Medical Center. He died in 2001 in Cayce, South Carolina, and was interred at Southland Memorial Gardens.
