= Cyril Blažo =

Slovak artist

Cyril Blažo (born 1970) is a Slovak artist. He lives and works in Bratislava.

He has been teaching at the University of Trnava since 1999 and currently teaches drawing, graphics, writing and graphic design, focusing on the basics of these artistic media and building the technical, technological and creative foundations of student work. In 2002, he won the award of the city of Banská Bystrica on the Trian of Contemporary Slovak Graphics. His works are presented in the collections of the Slovak National Gallery in Bratislava and the Central Slovak Gallery in Banská Bystrica.

== Early life and education ==
Blažo was born in 1970 in Bratislava. He was educated in Bratislava, attending trade school from 1984 to 1988, and the Academy of Fine Arts and Design (VŠVU) from 1988 to 1994.

== Exhibitions ==
Blažo has had many solo exhibitions domestically and internationally:

Year	Title	Venue
2011	Cyril Blažo: Pekný žobrák	Moravian Gallery, Brno, Czech Republic
2010	Cyril Blažo _ xyz	amt_project, Bratislava, Slovakia
2009	Bez Lepidla	Galéria Jána Koniarka, Trnava, Slovakia
2007	Cyril Blažo	Kunstverein München, Munich, Germany
2006	C. Blažo	Tranzit, Bratislava, Slovakia
2002	Bol raz jeden (kráľovstvo ničnerobenia)	galerie g99, The Brno House of Arts, Brno, Czech Republic
1999	Cyril Blažo	atelier noon, Prague, Czech Republic
1999	Napĺňané brušká, spolu s markom blažom	Galéria Priestor for contemporary arts, Bratislava, Slovakia
1999	Najlepší spôsob ako začať deň	Galéria Tatrasoft, Bratislava, Slovakia
1994	Cyril Blažo	Havlíčkova 20, Bratislava, Slovakia

== Group exhibitions ==
In addition to his solo exhibition, Blažo has been exhibited in a number of group exhibitions:

Year	Title	Venue
2010	She has the sense of limited time	amt _ project, Bratislava, Slovakia
2010	Hole in the flow	Hunt & Kastner, Prague, Czech Republic
2010	Cyril blažo + xyz: rajóny	Make Up Gallery, Kosice, Slovakia
2008	The language of humour	Soga, Bratislava, Slovakia
2008	Bcxyz	Bastart Contemporary, Bratislava, Slovakia
2007	Moja vec, čo nemusí byť moja	Bastart Contemporary, Bratislava, Slovakia
2007	Small scale	Kressling Gallery, Bratislava, Slovakia
2007	Kvintakord	Galerie Slovenského Institutu, Prague, Czech Republic
2007	Pitoreska	Wannieck Gallery of Modern Art, Brno, Czech Republic
2006	Akvizície 2001 - 2005	šg bb, Banská Bystrica, Slovakia
2006	Hodokvas	Letisko Piešťany, Slovakia
2005	Disorientation	Globe Gallery, Newcastle Upon Tyne, United Kingdom
2005	Prague Biennale 2	Karlin Hall, Prague, Czech Republic
2005	bezobrazie/media s-cream	Galéria Jána Koniarka, Trnava, Slovakia
2005	Check slovakia!	Koloman Sokol Gallery, Embassy of the Slovakia, Washington, DC, USA
2004	Check slovakia!	Neuer Berliner Kunstverein, Berlin, Germany
2004	Hot Destination/Marginal Destiny II	The Brno House of Arts, Brno, Czech Republic
2003	Hľadanie formule	Galéria Medium, Bratislava, Slovakia
2003	Súčasná slovenská grafika 15	Východoslovenská Galéria, Košice, Slovakia
2003	Ceskoslovensko	Slovenské Národné Múzeum (SNM), Bratislava, Slovakia
2003	Priveľa výnimiek	Považská Galéria Umenia, Zilina, Slovakia
2003	Súčasná slovenská grafika 15	Sarišská Galéria, Prešov, Slovakia
2002	Súčasná slovenská grafika 15	šg bb, Banská Bystrica, Slovakia
2001	Expresívne tendencie	Považská galéria umenia, Zilina, Slovakia
2001	Tucet	Východoslovenská Galéria, Košice, Slovakia
2001	Výtvarné doteky visegrádské čtyřky	Galerie Chagall, Ostrava, Czech Republic
2001	Slovenská strela	Karolinum, Prague, Czech Republic
2000	Humor sk - ostra vakcina alebo mladé mäso - (ne)zlá krv	Výstavní Síň Sokolská 26, Ostrava, Czech Republic
2000	Späť do múzea - späť k hviezdam	Slovak National Gallery (SNG), Bratislava, Slovakia
1999	Blue fire, 3. biennial of young art	GHMP, Prague, Czech Republic
1999	Slovak Art for Free	Venice Biennale, Czechoslovak pavilion, Venice, Italy
1998	Alternatívna slovenská grafika	The Brno House of Arts, Brno, Czech Republic
1997	Alternatívna slovenská grafika	šg bb, Banská Bystrica, Slovakia
1997	Reciprocita	Galerie Avu, Prague, Czech Republic
1996	Blondiak	Galéria Cypriána Majerníka, Bratislava, Slovakia
1995	Disperzia	Slovak National Gallery, Bratislava, Slovakia
1994	Marginalia	Považská Galéria Umenia, Zilina, Slovakia
1994	Disperzia	Gvuo, Ostrava, Czech Republic
1993	Tajomstvo	Považská Galéria Umenia, Zilina, Slovakia
1992	Projekt Istropolitana	Academy of Fine Arts and Design (VŠVU), Bratislava, Slovakia
1992	Barbakan '92	šg bb, Banská Bystrica, Slovakia
1992	Zwischen objekt und installation	Museum am Ostwall, Dortmund, Germany
1992	Talenty	Záhorská Galéria, Senica, Slovakia
1992	Hostia prešparty	VŠVU, Bratislava, Slovakia
1991	Schrijvers, Dančiak Jr., Blažo, Ondreička	Galéria Medium, Bratislava, Slovakia
1990	Kunst und revolution	Museum der Stadt Regensburg, Germany
