= Cyril Alliston =

English cricketer

Personal information
- Full name: Cyril George Prat Alliston
- Born: 1 November 1891; West Kensington, London
- Died: 21 July 1973 (aged 81); Southport, Lancashire
- Batting: Right-handed
- Bowling: Right-arm medium

Domestic team information
- Years: Team
- 1922: Kent
- Only First-class: 1 July 1922 Kent v Warwickshire
- Source: CricInfo, 5 April 2021

Cyril George Prat Alliston (1 November 1891 – 21 July 1973) was an English businessman and cricketer who played in one first-class cricket match for Kent County Cricket Club in 1922. Alliston worked in the cotton printing business and served in the Canadian Expeditionary Force during World War I.

== Early life ==
Alliston was born at West Kensington in London in 1891, the son of Paul and Augusta Alliston. His paternal grandfather, Sir Frederick Alliston, had established the family firm, Alliston and Co, in London in 1857. The company was in the cotton printing business, and Alliston's father was active in the business, becoming the company chairman by 1914. The family lived in Beckenham and Alliston was educated at Repton School where he played cricket and football in the school teams, and was a member of the school's Officer Training Corps.

== Military service ==
After leaving school, Alliston moved to Canada where he worked as a book-keeper. Following the start of World War I, he enlisted in the Edmonton Regiment of the Canadian Expeditionary Force in January 1915 at Grouard, Alberta. He transferred with the 49th battalion to Europe and was commissioned as a Lieutenant in August whilst at Shorncliffe Army Camp in Kent.

Alliston's battalion transferred to France later in the year and was serving in the Ypres Salient when he was wounded in the abdomen in March 1916. After time in hospital at Boulogne and in London, he returned to Canada on leave and was discharged in September, unfit for further military service.

== Professional life and cricket career ==
Soon after his discharge, Alliston returned to England where he began working for the family firm in London. He was granted the Freedom of the City of London in 1920 and was a freemason. He continued to play club cricket for Beckenham and in 1922 made his debut for Kent's Second XI in the Minor Counties Championship, taking six wickets against Bedfordshire. His only match for the county First XI came later in the same year against Warwickshire at Edgbaston in the County Championship. He did not score in his only innings and was not required to bowl as Kent bowled Warwickshire out cheaply twice. He played in two more Second XI matches the following season but only took one more wicket.

Towards the end of the 1920s Alliston moved to Southport where he became the company's representative in the key cotton industrial area of north west England. He played cricket for Southport and Birkdale, captaining them in 1931 and 1944–1945 and making over 200 appearances. He was one of the club's vice-presidents.

== Family ==
Alliston married Marjorie Pert. Their son Maurice played alongside Alliston in Southport. Alliston died at Southport in 1973 aged 81.

== Bibliography ==
- Carlaw, Derek (2020). Kent County Cricketers, A to Z: Part Two (1919–1939) (PDF). Cardiff: ACS.
