= Cyril Browne (cricketer) =

English cricketer

Personal information
- Full name: Cyril Ross Browne
- Born: 7 February 1893; Kings Norton, Worcestershire, England
- Died: 30 April 1948 (aged 55); Eastbourne, Sussex, England
- Batting: Right-handed
- Bowling: Right-arm medium
- Relatives: Francis Browne (brother)

Domestic team information
- Years: Team
- 1913–1919: Sussex
- 1913–1919: Cambridge University

Career statistics
Competition	First-class
Matches	10
Runs scored	146
Batting average	8.11
100s/50s	–/–
Top score	23
Balls bowled	464
Wickets	11
Bowling average	29.90
5 wickets in innings	–
10 wickets in match	–
Best bowling	4/8
Catches/stumpings	2/–
- Source: Cricinfo, 19 July 2013

Cyril Ross Browne (7 February 1893 – 30 April 1948) was an English cricketer active either side of the First World War. Born at Kings Norton, Worcestershire, Browne was a right-handed batsman and right-arm medium-pace bowler, Browne made ten appearances in first-class cricket.

== Career ==
While studying at Emmanuel College, Cambridge, Browne made his first-class debut for the university cricket club against Northamptonshire at Fenner's in 1913. Later in that same season, Browne made his debut for Sussex against Cambridge University. He made three first-class appearances in the following season, playing three times for Cambridge University against Sussex, the Free Foresters, and HDG Leveson Gower's XI.

During the First World War Browne was an officer in the Royal Naval Volunteer Reserve. He had expected to be sent to sea but, to his annoyance, was sent as an infantryman with the Royal Naval Division to Gallipoli.

After the war, Browne resumed his studies at Cambridge and played once for the university in 1919 against the Free Foresters. He played twice for Sussex in the 1919 County Championship against Surrey and Kent, as well as playing two final first-class matches for HDG Leveson Gower's XI at The Saffrons against Cambridge University and Oxford University. Browne played a total of ten first-class matches, scoring 146 runs at an average of 8.11, with a high score of 23, while with the ball he took 11 wickets, averaging 29.90 per wicket, with best bowling figures of 4/8.

He taught at Harrow School for 29 years and was the master of cricket there. He died at Eastbourne, Sussex, on 30 April 1948. His brother Francis also played first-class cricket.
