= Cyril Buffet =

French historian

Cyril Buffet (born 1958) is a French historian of 20th century international relations, especially Franco-German relations, the history of Brandenburg, the German Democratic Republic, and of the city of Berlin.

Buffet was educated at the Lycée Condorcet in Paris and the University of Paris-Sorbonne. He worked at the Centre Marc Bloch and the Allied Museum in Berlin, and for several museum projects. He has taught at the Humboldt University Berlin; the INALCO, Paris; the University of Reading; and the École Supérieure de Journalisme, Lille. In 2009, he acquired a higher doctorate (Habilitation) at the University of Paris III: Sorbonne Nouvelle.

Buffet is an independent researcher and makes and works as consultant for historical TV documentaries and virtual and actual exhibitions.

== Bibliography ==
- Le jour où le mur est tombé [The day the wall fell] (Paris: Larousse, 2009), ISBN 9782035836656.
- Defunte DEFA : Histoire de l’autre cinéma allemand [The late DEFA: History of the other German Cinema] (Paris : 7e Art, 2008), ISBN 2204085464.
- Le Mur de Berlin (Caen: Mémorial de Caen, 1999.) ISBN 291020197X.
- Fisimatenten: Les Français à Berlin et en Brandebourg (Berlin: Sénat, 1997; 2nd impression 1999, 3rd impression/new edition 2004).
- Histoire de Berlin. Des origines à nos jours (Paris: Presses Universitaires de France, Collection Que sais-je?, 1994), ISBN 2130466656.
- Berlin (Paris: Fayard, 1993), ISBN 2213029822.
- La France et l'Allemagne, 1945-1949 [France and Germany, 1945-1949] (Paris: Armand Colin, 1991)(Prix de Strasbourg 1993), ISBN 2200372574.
- editor: Cinema in the Cold War: Political Projections (Abigdon: Routledge, 2015), ISBN 1138952346.
- With Lori Maguire (eds): Cinéma et Guerre froide [Cinema and Cold War] (Paris: Cinemaction, 2014), ISBN 2847065547.
- With Bernard Genton and others: Die Kulturpolitik der vier Besatzungsmächte in Berlin, 1945-1949 [the cultural politics of the four occupying powers in Berlin, 1945-49] (Leipzig: Universitätsverlag, 1999)
- with Nicole Pietri & Bernard Michel: Les villes germaniques au XIXème siècle (Paris: SEDES, 1992)
- With Uwe Prell: Stabilität und Teilung: die Berlin-Krise 1948/49, Auftakt zum Kalten Krieg in Europa (Berlin-Ouest: Arno Spitz, 1987).
- With Rémy Hardourtzel: La collaboration [on French Collaboration in World War II] (Paris: Perrin, 1989), 276 p., (Prix de l’Académie française.)
- editor with Leopoldo Nuti: Dividing the Atom: Proliferation and Nuclear Politics, 1957-1969 (Rome: IRS, 1998).
- editor with Etienne François, Wolf Lepenies, Anne-Marie Le Gloannec, Nathalie Buffet: France-Allemagne [Franco-German relations] (Paris: Ministère des Affaires étrangères, ADPF, 1998), 141p.
- editor with Beatrice Heuser: Haunted by History: Myths in International Relations (Oxford: Berghahn, 1998).

== Filmography and exhibitions ==
- TV documentary: Le Cinéma fait le mur (France: 2014).
- TV documentary: Les meilleurs ennemis du monde: Des influences culturelles entre la France et l’Allemagne. Fremde Freunde. Wechselwirkungen französischer und deutscher Kultur (Arte: 1996), 60 min.
- Exhibition: Der private Blick. Fotographien amerikanischer, britischer und französischer Soldaten von 1945, (Berlin, Alliierten Museum, 2005).
- Exhibition: La crise des missiles de Cuba. Treize jours qui ébranlèrent le monde, Virtual exhibition (Caen, France: Mémorial de Caen, 2002).
- Exhibition: Rideau de béton. Vie et mort du Mur de Berlin. Virtual exhibition (Caen, France: Mémorial de Caen, 1999).
- Exhibition: With Uwe Prell: Die Berliner Luftbrücke, (Berlin- Tegel, 1987).
