= Cyrille =

Cyrille is both a French masculine given name and a surname. Notable people with the name include:

== People with the given name ==
- Cyrille Adoula (1921–1978), Congolese politician who served as Premier of the Republic of the Congo (1961–1964)
- Cyrille Aimée (born 1984), French jazz singer
- Cyrille Beaudry (1835–1904), Canadian priest and educator
- Cyrille Florent Bella (born 1975), Cameroonian football player (senior career from 1998) who was a member of the Cameroonian national team (1997 and 2003)
- Cyrille Carré (born 1984), French Olympic canoeist and 2007 ICF Canoe Sprint World Champion in the K-2 1000 m event
- Cyrille-Hector-Octave Côté (1809–1850), physician who served in the Legislative Assembly of Lower Canada and went on to be ordained as a Baptist minister
- Cyrille Courtin (born 1971), French football player (senior career 1989–2003)
- Cyrille-Fraser Delâge (1869–1957), Canadian notary and political figure who served in the Legislative Assembly of Quebec (1901–1916) including as Speaker (1912–1916)
- Cyrille Diabaté (born 1973), French mixed martial arts fighter and kickboxer
- Cyrille Dion (1843–1878) ("the Bismarck of Billiards"), Canadian champion player of pool and billiards
- Cyril Domoraud (Depri Cyrille Leandre Domoraud) (born 1971), Ivorian football player (senior career 1992–2008) who played for the Côte d'Ivoire national team (1995–2006)
- Cyrille Doyon (1842–1918), merchant, farmer and politician who served in the Canadian House of Commons (1887–1891) and in the Legislative Assembly of Quebec (1892–1897)
- Cyrille Dumaine (1897–1946), Canadian politician from Quebec
- Octave-Cyrille Fortier (1810–1872 or later), Canadian physician and politician who served in the Legislative Assembly of the Province of Canada (1854–1861)
- François-Cyrille Grange (born 1983), French alpine skier and Winter Olympian
- Cyrille Guimard (born 1947), French professional road bicycle racer (1968–1976) and later sporting director / team manager (from 1976)
- Cyrille Mubiala Kitambala (born 1974), Congolese football player (senior career from 1998) who joined the Congolese national team in 2002
- Johan Cyrille Corneel Vande Lanotte (born 1955), Belgian politician and Member of the Senate (from 2007)
- Cyrille Pierre Théodore Laplace (1793–1875), French navigator who circumnavigated the globe on board La Favorite
- Cyrille Magnier (born 1969), French football player (senior career 1987–2005)
- Cyrille Makanaky (born 1965), Cameroonian football player (senior career 1984–1997) who played in the Cameroonian national team (1987–1992)
- Cyrille Makanda (born 1980), Cameroonian-Russian basketball player who competes internationally for Cameroon
- Arthur Cyrille Albert Malouin (1857–1936), Canadian lawyer and politician who served in the Canadian House of Commons (1898–1905), as a Judge of the Quebec Superior Court (1905–1924), and as a Justice of the Supreme Court (1924)
- Cyrille Mangan (born 1976), Cameroonian football player (senior career 1996–2008) who was a member of the Cameroonian national team (1996–1998)
- Cyrille Merville (born 1982), French football player (senior career from 1999)
- Albert-Marie Joseph Cyrille de Monléon (1937–2019), former Bishop of Pamiers (1988–1999) and current Bishop of Meaux (from 1999)
- Cyrille Monnerais (born 1983), French professional road bicycle racer
- Joseph Cyrille Ndo (born 1976), Cameroonian football player (senior career from 1997) who was a member of the Cameroonian national team (1998–2002)
- Cyrille Neveu (born 1973), Long Distance Triathlon World Champion (2002) who established the Alpe d'Huez Triathlon in 2006
- Cyrille Pouget (born 1972), French football player (senior career, 1994–2006) who played on the French national team in 1996
- Cyrille Regis (1958–2018), French-born footballer (senior career 1977–1996) who played for the England national team (1982–1987)
- Cyrille Rose (1830–1902/3?), French clarinet teacher and composer of clarinet pedagogical material still in wide use
- Cyrille Sauvage (born 1973), French racecar driver who has competed in International Formula 3000 and Porsche Supercup series and won Formula Renault Championships in 1995
- Cyrille Sevin, French three-times World Champion at the strategic board game Diplomacy, recorded in the International prize list of Diplomacy
- Cyrille Thouvenin, actor, who played the character of Laurent in the French television drama Just a Question of Love (film)
- Cyrille Émile Vaillancourt (1848–1912), physician and political figure who served in the Canadian House of Commons (1891–1896)
- Cyrille Vaillancourt (1892–1969), journalist, civil servant, businessman and political figure who served in the Legislative Council of Quebec (1943–1944) and the Canadian Senate(1944–1969)
- Cyrille van Effenterre, current President of the IDEA League, a strategic alliance of five of Europe's leading universities of technology
- Cyrille van Hauwaert (1883–1974), Belgian professional road bicycle racer who won classics including Bordeaux–Paris (1907 and 1909), Milan–San Remo (1908), and Paris–Roubaix (1908)
- Cyrille van Hoof, housemate in the first season of Big Brother 1999 (Netherlands)
- Cyrille Verbrugge (1866–1929), Belgian Olympic fencer
- Cyrille Verdeaux, leader of the progressive rock band Clearlight (French band)
- Cyrille Watier (born 1972), French football player (senior career 1994–2007)
- Jean-Cyrille Guesnon de Bonneuil, married name of Michelle de Bonneuil (1748–1829), French overseas agent during the French Revolution and First French Empire

== People with the surname ==
- Andrew Cyrille (born 1939), American avant-garde jazz drummer

== Fictional characters ==
- Cyrille, fictional character in the PlayStation 2 action role-playing game Shining Force EXA

== See also ==
- Saint-Cyrille-de-Lessard, Quebec, a parish municipality in Quebec, Canada
- Saint-Cyrille-de-Wendover, Quebec, a town located alongside the Rivière des Saults in the Drummond Regional County Municipality of Quebec, Canada
- Cyril Leo Heraclius, Prince Toumanoff (born Toumanishvili) (1913–1997), Russian-born historian and genealogist who was a professor emeritus at Georgetown University
