= Fondazione Manodori =

Italian banking foundation

Fondazione Cassa di Risparmio di Reggio Emilia – Pietro Manodori known as Fondazione Manodori, is a non-profit organization based in Palazzo del Monte, Reggio Emilia, Emilia-Romagna. The organization originated from the saving bank of the city (Cassa di Risparmio di Reggio Emilia) found by Pietro Manodori.

== Foundation today ==
Upon the merger of Capitalia and UniCredit, the foundation was a minority shareholder of UniCredit for 0.90% as the 8th largest shareholder. It was decreased to 0.38% as at 31 December 2013 and 0.278% at 31 December 2015.

== Foundations Art Collection ==
The Art Collection of the Foundation of Reggio Emilia Saving Bank – Pietro Manodori (Italian: Collezione d'arte della Fondazione Cassa di Risparmio di Reggio Emilia Pietro Manodori) is a small, but publicly exhibited collection of artists mainly from the Emilia-Romagna region, especially concentrating in works from the 17th century, the Baroque period when the local artist community, along with the Bolognese school of painters, had gained prominence. Collecting by this financial house began in earnest in the mid-1990s.

The collection was collected by Cassa di Risparmio di Reggio Emilia, which was absorbed into UniCredit. However, the art collection was owned by the former owner of the bank instead, the Fondazione Cassa di Risparmio di Reggio Emilia Pietro Manodori (Fondazione Manodori in short). The collection also includes more works collected by Elio Monducci; an endowment of works and studies by Marco Gerra (1925–2000) donated by his widow, Anna Maria Ternelli; and finally works by Alberto Manfredi.

== Historic Collection (1500-1800) ==
Label	Painter	Span	Work	Link
1	Studio of Federico Barocci	late 16th century	Stigmata of Saint Francis	
2	Carlo Bononi	1569–1632	Allegory of Spiritual Power (sketch for the Basilica della Ghiara)	
3	Ludovico Carracci	1555–1619	Omphale	
4	Girolamo Donnini	1681–1743	Massacre of the Innocents	
5	Girolamo Donnini	1681–1743	Sacrifice of Jephthah	
6	Luca Ferrari	1605–1654	Jupiter and Semele	
7	Antonio Fontanesi	1818–1882	Terrace and Garden by a Lake (1845)	
8	Antonio Fontanesi	1818–1882	Hermit's Cave After the Storm (1845)	
9	Antonio Fontanesi	1818–1882	The Waterfall (1845)	
10	Marcantonio Franceschini	1648–1729	Delphic Sibyl	
11	Giovanni Lanfranco	1582–1647	Alexander and His Doctor	
12	Giovanni Lanfranco	1582–1647	Alexander Refuses Water from His Soldiers	
13	Cristoforo Munari	1667–1720	Still Life with Cabbage, Prosciutto, Pumpkin, Terracotta and Piatto with Knife	
14	Cristoforo Munari	1667–1720	Still life with Jewel Box, Flower Vase, Teapot, Water Jug, Cups and Saucer, Chinese Porcelain, and Books on a Table Covered with a Red Tablecloth	
15	Cristoforo Munari	1667–1720	Still Life with Steak, Shicken and Pewter Pot	
16	Cristoforo Munari	1667–1720	Allegory of Art, Architecture, Painting, Sculpture, Music, and Poetry (Still Life with Wall, Ewer, Relief of an Emperor, Books, Musical Notation, Mandola, Flute, Brush and Palette)	
17	Camillo Procaccini	1550–1629	Crown of Thorns Placed on Christ	
18	Alessandro Tiarini	1577–1688	Tamar and Judith	
19	Alessandro Tiarini	1577–1688	Vulcan Tempers the Arrows of Cupid	

== Monducci Collections ==
Label	Painter	Span	Work	Link
1	Alfonso Beccaluva	1839 - 1871	Pecore e asino al pascolo and Oak in front of a Villa	
2	Giuseppe Boccaccio	1790 - 1852	Theater scenography	
3	Vincenzo Carnevali	1778 - 1842	Ceiling ornament with Putti and Ornament	
4	Luigi Casali Bassi	1805 - 1872	Landscape and Landscape with figures	
5	Alfonso Chierici	1816 - 1873	Bersaglieri sulle rive del Garda and Figura di ciociaro	
6	Gaetano Chierici	1838 - 1920	Good Company, Mother's Joys,L’ammonimento del frate, and First Steps	
7	Cosimo Cosmi	1803 - 1867	Male figure	
8	Romeo Costetti	1871 - 1957	Landscape	
9	Ottorino Davoli	1888 - 1945	The Sunset, Nude drawing of Young Woman, Venetian Lagoon and Paesaggio con mucca	
10	Anna (detta Nina) Ferrari	1878 - 1926	Il Parco Ottavi	
11	Girolamo Donnini	1681 - 1743	Birth of Adonis and The infancy of Jove	
12	Giulio Ferrari	1858 - 1934	Mountain Landscape	
13	Paolo Ferretti	1822 - 1904	On First of June, Il Crostolo, Forest near Monte Gaio, The Citadel of Reggio; La Modolena and La prigione di cittadella	
14	Giovanni Fontanesi	1813 - 1875	Surroundings of La Spezia and Marine Landscape	
15	Antonio Fontanesi	1818 - 1882	Al pascolo, Alpine landscape and Landscape with animals	
16	Cirillo Manicardi	1856 - 1925	Veduta di montagna	
16	Domenico Menozzi	1777 - 1841	Landscape	
18	Prospero Minghetti	1786 - 1853	St Francis in Ecstasy	
19	Augusto Mussini		Homage to Plato	
20	Lazzaro Pasini	1861 - 1949	Recco	
21	Alessandro Prampolini	1823 - 1865	Temple of Vesta in Tivoli, Il lago di Albano, and View of Rome	
22	Giuseppe Tirelli	1859 - 1931	Campo di sorgo e contadina, Rustic House con fienile, and Church of Massenzatico	
23	Domenico Pellizzi	1818 - 1874	Old Man's Bust	
