= Cirillo =

- Pronunciation: Italian: [tʃiˈrillo]
- Gender: male
- Language: Italian

Origin
- Origin: Ancient Greek Κύριλλος (Kyrillos)
- Meaning: lordly, masterful

Other names
- Related names: Cyril, Cyrille, Cyryl, Cyrillus, Kiril, Kirill, Kirillos, Kiryl, Kyryl

Cirillo is the Italian form of the name "Cyril". It is derived from Ancient Greek κύριλλος (Kýrillos) 'lordly, masterful', from κυριος (kýrios) 'lord'.

The standard botanical author abbreviation "Cirillo" refers to Domenico Cirillo.

== Given name ==
- Cirillo Manicardi (1856–1925), Italian painter
- Cirillo "Nello" Pagani (191 – 2003), Italian motorcycle racer and Formula 1 driver

== Surname ==
- Christophe Cirillo, French singer-songwriter performing in pop and chanson music genres
- Claudio Cirillo, Italian cinematographer
- Domenico Cirillo (1739–1799), Italian physician and patriot
- Edward Cirillo, former member of the Arizona State Senate
- Lanfranco Cirillo (born 1959), Italian architect
- Lidia Cirillo (born 1940), Italian writer and socialist feminist
- Nicholas Cirillo (born 1997), American actor and producer
- Sarah Ashton-Cirillo, American journalist and spokesperson for Ukraine's Territorial Defence Forces
- Wally Cirillo (1927−1977), American jazz pianist and composer

=== Crime ===
- Ciro Cirillo (1921–2017), Italian politician kidnapped by the Red Brigades
- Dominick Cirillo (born 1929), "Quiet Dom", member of the Genovese crime family
- Nathan Cirillo (1989–2014), Canadian soldier

=== Religion ===
- Bernardino Cirillo (1500–1575), Roman Catholic Archbishop of Loreto, Italy
- Cyrillus Jarre (born Rudolf Jarre, 1878–1952), Franciscan Archbishop in Jinan, China, also known as Cirillo Rudolfus Jarre

=== Sports ===
- Bruno Cirillo (born 1977), Italian footballer
- Damián Cirillo (born 1980), Argentine footballer
- Gennaro Cirillo (born 1961), Italian sprint canoer
- Gustavo Cirillo (born 1961), Argentine sprint canoer
- Jeff Cirillo (born 1960), American baseball player
- Sara Cirillo (born 2004), Italian sprinter
