= Palazzo Spalletti-Trivelli =

Italian palace

Coordinates: 44°41′53.7″N 10°37′56.8″E

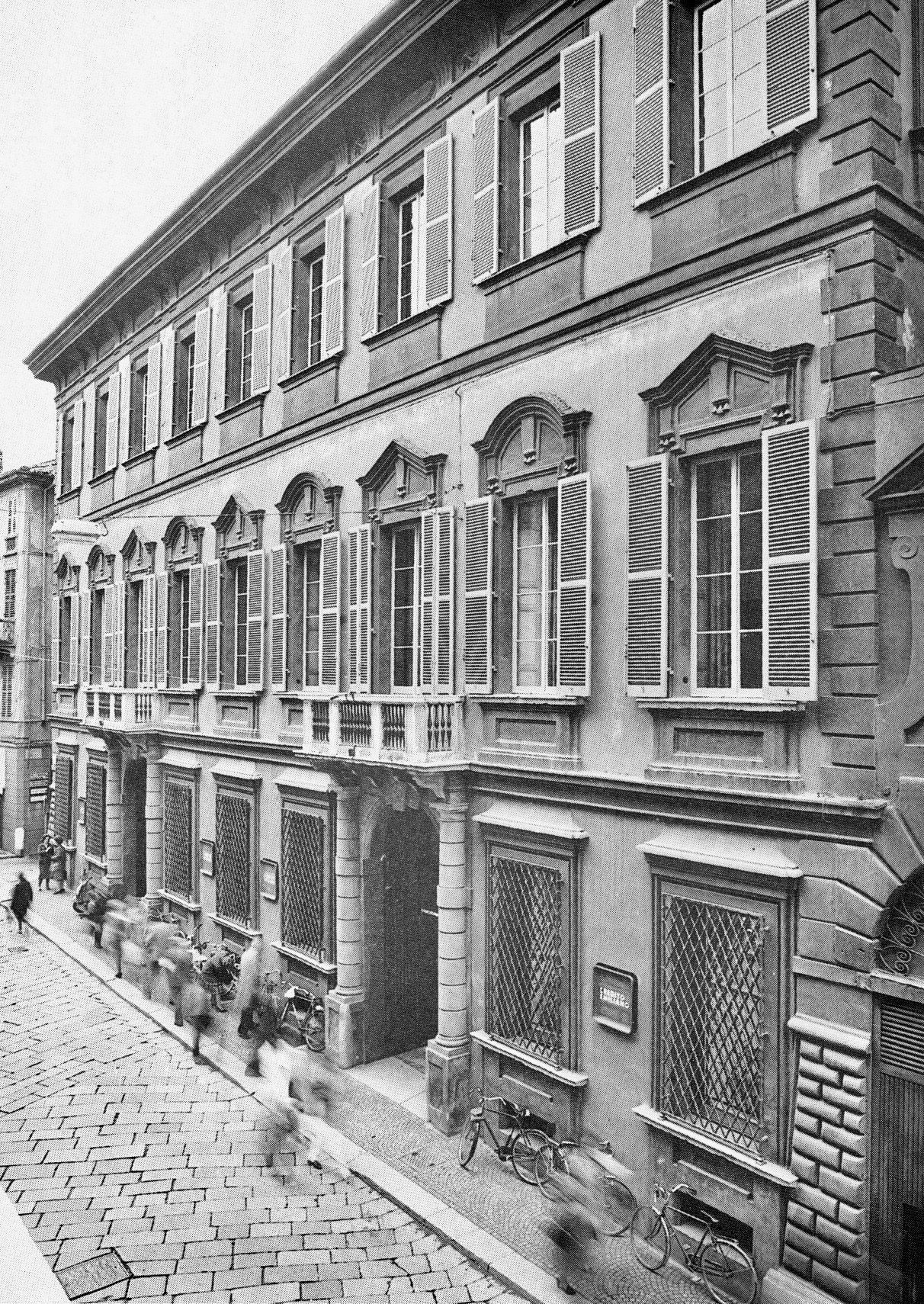

Palazzo Spalletti-Trivelli (formerly Guicciardi) is a palace located at Via Emilia A San Pietro #2, corner with Via San Nicolò, in the center of the city of Reggio Emilia, region of Emilia Romagna, Italy. The building now belongs to the Credito Emiliano (Credem) bank, and owns the art collection now in the palace.

== History ==
The building was erected atop ancient Roman ruins, still visible in the basement. A large house or palace was owned by the Bosi Family until 1685. It was rebuilt in the 1700s under the patronage of the new owner Count Guicciardi using designs by the architect Giovanni Maria Ferraroni, and refurbished in the early 1800s in a Neoclassical style by Pietro Marchelli, when the palace was acquired by the Spalletti-Trivelli family, who also owned the adjacent building.

A salon of the piano nobile has a ceiling painting depicting Apollo with the Court of the Hours by Prospero Minghetti, and a ball room with trompe-l'œil colonnades and curtains painted by Vincenzo Carnevali. In addition, the bank houses here its collection of Emilian paintings and Oriental art, viewable by appointment. The painting collection includes the following works;

- Madonna and Child by Francesco Raibolini ("Il Francia")
- Madonna and Child by Lorenzo Costa
- Burial of St Stefano by Lorenzo Sabbatini
- Adoration of the Magi by Dionisio Calvart
- Annunciation by Dionisio Calvart
- Visitation by Scarsellino
- Marriage of the Virgin by Scarsellino
- Congedo di Cristo dalla Madre by Scarsellino
- Adoration of the Magi by Scarsellino
- St Joseph and the Angel by Scarsellino
- Peter denying Jesus by Camillo Procaccini
- Death of the Virgin by Camillo Procaccini
- Death of St Paul by Camillo Procaccini
- Coronation of the Virgin by Follower of Annibale Carracci
- Moses and the Tables of the Law by Guido Reni
- Ecce Homo by Guido Reni
- Magdalen by follower of Guido Reni
- Salome and the Head of John the Baptist by Leonello Spada
- Deposition by Alessandro Tiarini
- Salvator Mundi by Alessandro Tiarini
- Expulsion of Adam and Eve by Francesco Albani
- Madonna della Ghiara di Reggio by Isidoro Bianchi
- David with the Head of Goliath by Luca Ferrari, called Luca da Reggio
- Salome and the Head of John the Baptist by Luca da Reggio
- Miracle of St Antony of Padua by Carlo Francesco Nuvolone
- Angelica and Medoro by Simone Cantarini
- Bathsheba at the Bath by Antonio Triva
- Mary Magdalen by Lorenzo Pasinelli
- Judith with the Head of Holofernes by Lorenzo Pasinelli
- Interior of Kitchen by Giovanni Domenico Valentino
- Interior of a Rigattiere (used goods warehouse) by GD Valentino
- St Catherine before Emperor Maximian by Francesco Stringa
- Miracle of the Wheel by Francesco Stringa
- Lot accompanied by Angels by Marcantonio Franceschini
- Lot and Daughters by MA Franceschini
- Hunted Game and Rooster by Felice Boselli
- Hunted Game and Owl by Felice Boselli
- Fish and Seafood by Felice Boselli
- Trophy of Hunt and a Dog by Felice Boselli
- Diana and a few Amori by Giovanni Gioseffo Dal Sole
- Ecstasy of the Magdalen by Gian Gioseffo Dal Sole
- Mercury by Giovanni Antonio Burrini
- Pastoral scene by Giuseppe Maria Crespi
- Still life by Cristoforo Munari
- Crowning with thorns attributed to Domenico Maria Viani
- Allegory of Experience by Donato Creti
- St Sebastian by Marcantonio Ghislina
- Satyr and Musical Putti by Federico Bencovich
- Series: Allegories of the Seasons by Girolamo Donnini
- Eurydice bitten by Serpent by Girolamo Donnini
- Death of Adonis by Girolamo Donnini
- Martyrdom of St Paul by Francesco Monti (1719)
- After the Battle by Francesco Simonini
- Cavalieri in sosta in un paesaggio by Francesco Simonini
- Diana and Endymion by Ercole Graziani the Younger
- Erminia and Shepherds by E Graziani il Giovane
- Rinaldo prevents Armida's Suicide by E Graziani il Giovane
- Series: Hunts with Dogs of Boar, Lynx, Bear, and Bull by Giovanni Crivelli ("il Crivellino")
- Joseph and the Wife of Potiphar by 17th century Bolognese painter
- St Sebastian by unknown baroque Venetian painter
- Allegory of Arts and Virtue by Giovanni Giacomo Sementi
- Cimerian Sybil by Guercino
- Lot and Daughters by Giovanni Francesco Ferri
- St Sebastian by Domenico Pedrini
- Blessing of Jacob by Domenico Pedrini
- Exile of Hagar by Domenico Pedrini
- Joseph and Wife of Potiphar by Filippo Pedrini
- Christ and the Samaritan at the Well by follower of MA Franceschini
- Birth of Adonis and Abduction of Proserpine by unknown painters
