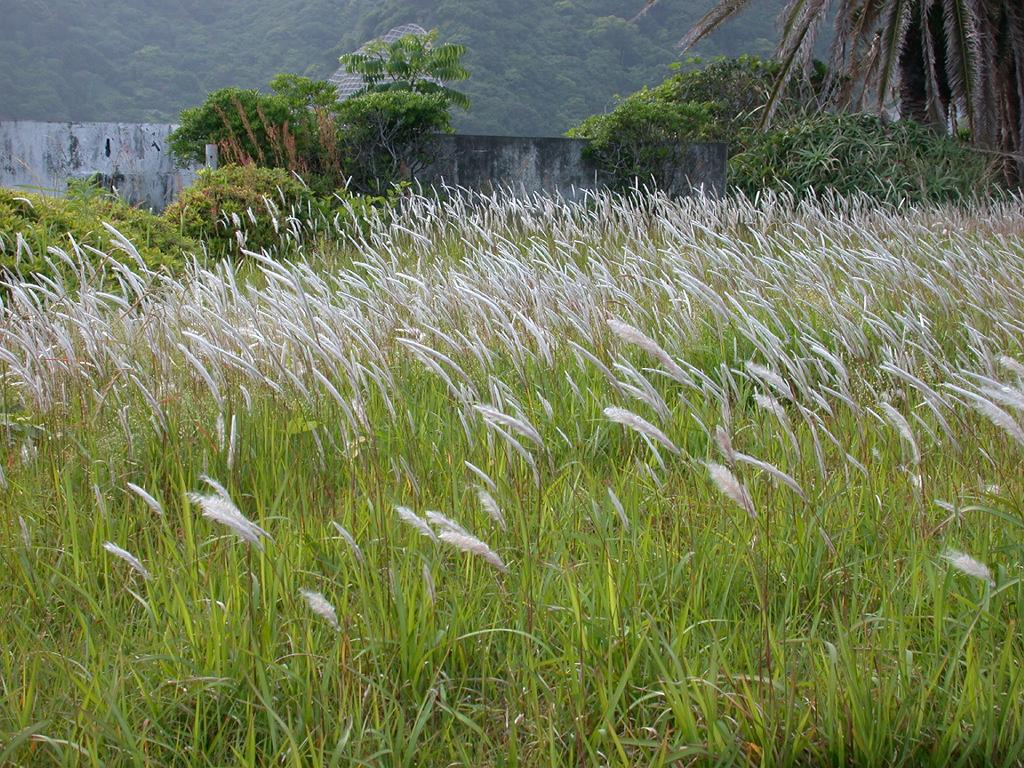
- Imperata cylindrica in Susami, Wakayama, Japan with mature seed heads

Scientific classification
- Kingdom: Plantae
- Clade: Tracheophytes
- Clade: Angiosperms
- Clade: Monocots
- Clade: Commelinids
- Order: Poales
- Family: Poaceae
- Subfamily: Panicoideae
- Genus: Imperata
- Species: I. cylindrica

Binomial name
- Imperata cylindrica (L.) P.Beauv.

Synonyms
- List: Calamagrostis lagurus (L.) Koeler; Imperata allang Jungh.; Imperata angolensis Fritsch; Imperata arundinacea Cirillo; Imperata dinteri Pilg.; Imperata filifolia Nees ex Steud.; Imperata koenigii (Retz.) P.Beauv.; Imperata laguroides (Pourr.) J.Roux; Imperata latifolia (Hook.f.) L.Liu; Imperata pedicellata Steud.; Imperata praecoquis Honda; Imperata robustior A.Chev.; Imperata sieberi Opiz; Imperata thunbergii P.Beauv.; Lagurus cylindricus L.; Saccharum cylindricum (L.) Lam.; Saccharum europeaum Pers.; Saccharum koenigii Retz.; Saccharum laguroides Pourr.; Saccharum sisca Cav.; Saccharum spicatum J.Presl; Saccharum thunbergii Retz.

= Imperata cylindrica =

Cogongrass

Species of grass

Imperata cylindrica (commonly known as cogongrass /koʊˈɡoʊn/ or kunai grass /ˈkuːnaɪ/) is a species of perennial rhizomatous grass native to tropical and subtropical Asia, Micronesia, Melanesia, Australia, Africa, and Southern Europe. It has also been introduced to Latin America, the Caribbean, and the Southeastern United States. It is a highly flammable pyrophyte, and can spread rapidly by colonizing disturbed areas and encouraging more frequent wildfires.

== Common names ==
The species is most commonly known in English as "cogongrass" (also "cogon grass"), from Spanish cogón, from the Tagalog and Visayan kugon. Other common names in English include kunai grass, blady grass, satintail, spear grass, sword grass, thatch grass, alang-alang, lalang grass, cotton wool grass, kura-kura, and keri, among other names.

== Taxonomy ==
Imperata cylindrica was first described by Linnaeus in 1759 under the basionym Lagurus cylindricus. They were renamed by the French entomologist and botanist Palisot de Beauvois to the current accepted name of Imperata cylindrica.

== Description ==
Cogongrass grows from 0.2–3 m (1/2–10 ft) tall, its stalk is firm and has nodes covered with long white hairs. Each clump that grows shares an extensive rhizome network, the biomass of which accounts for 60% of the total biomass of the plant. They can penetrate up to 1.2 m (4 ft) deep, but 0.4 m (1 1/2 ft) is typical in sandy soil.

The leaves are about 2 cm wide in average and 12–80 centimetres (4 1/2–31 1/2 in) in length near the base of the plant and narrow to a sharp point at the top; the margins are finely toothed and are embedded with sharp silica crystals. The main vein is a lighter colour than the rest of the leaf and tends to be nearer to one side of the leaf. The upper surface is hairy near the base of the plant while the underside is usually hairless.

Its flowers small and gathered on pedicels 0.5–3 mm long from narrow panicles slightly above its stalks that grow tall as high as 28 cm (11 in).

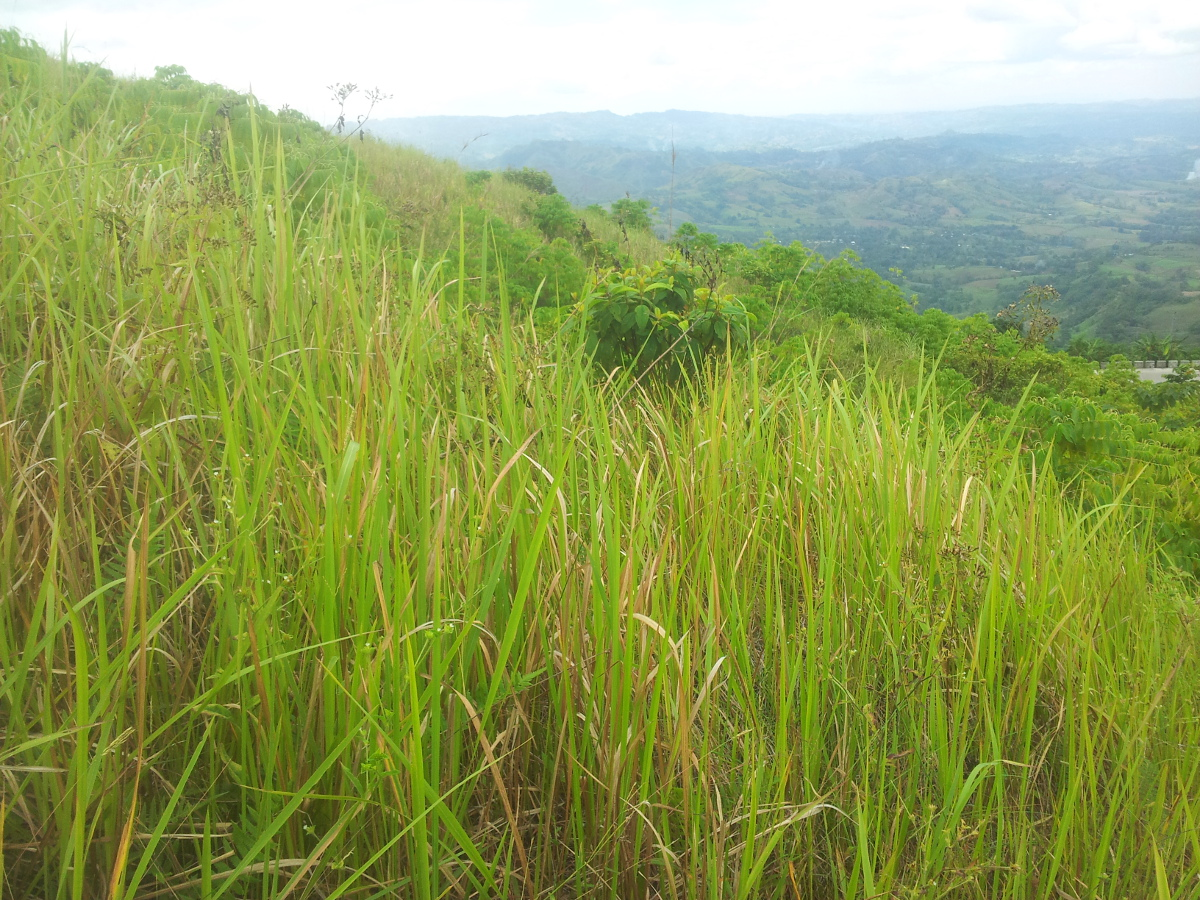
Imperata cylindrica on a mountainside in Bukidnon, Philippines

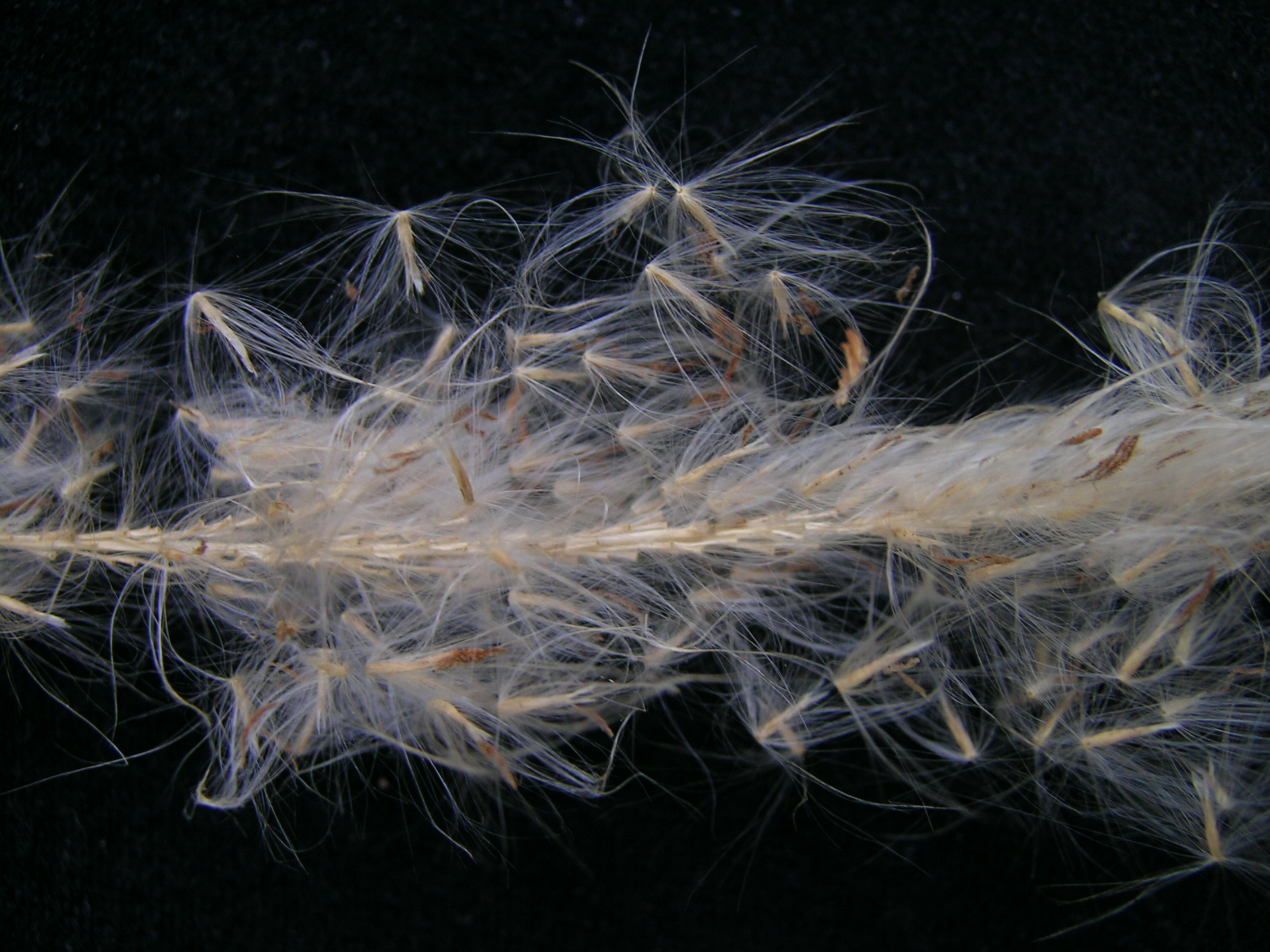
Seeds

=== Phytochemistry ===
The plant contains the triterpenoids arundoin, cylindrin and fernenol.

== Ecology ==
=== As a weed ===
The plant has become naturalized in the Americas, Northern Asia, Europe and Africa in addition to many islands and is listed as an invasive weed in some areas. In the United States it survives best in the Southeast (and, according to a 2003 survey, has overtaken more acreage in that region than the notorious kudzu), but has been reported to exist as far north as West Virginia and Oregon. Worldwide it has been observed from 45°N to 45°S. It grows on wet lands, dry lands, areas of high salinity, organic soils, clay soils, and sandy soils of pH from 4.0 to 7.5. It prefers full sun but will tolerate some shade. In Florida, I. cylindrica is found in areas where the soil has been disturbed, such as roadsides, building sites, timber harvesting areas, and borrow pits. It is able to invade both moist and dry upland pine forests. Once established it often forms dense monocultures.

In addition to outcompeting species for resources, the grass also exhibits allelopathic tendencies. The chemicals it releases as well as the dense mat of vegetation that usually accompanies a cogongrass invasion gives it an advantage over indigenous plants.

It spreads both through small seeds, which are easily carried by the wind, and rhizomes which can be transported by tilling equipment and in soil transport.

In the Southeastern U.S., state governments have various eradication efforts in place, and deliberate propagation is prohibited by some authorities. Cogongrass came to the Southeastern U.S. in the early 1900s as shipping material in crates. Before it was named an invasive species in the area, it was cultivated for fodder for livestock and erosion control. It failed to prevent erosion because of how weedy it was, and animals would not eat it as fodder. It is now listed as a Federal Noxious Weed in some Southeastern states and Arkansas. In Mississippi it is mostly concentrated in the south of the state.

Control is typically by the use of herbicides. Currently, the most effective herbicides used to control growth are glyphosate and imazapyr. Burnoff is seldom successful since the grass burns at a high temperature, causing heat damage to trees which would ordinarily be undamaged by a controlled burn; it also recovers from a burn quickly. Quarantine and extermination of this plant is especially difficult because cogongrass establishes root systems as deep as four feet, and regrowth can be triggered by rhizome segments as small as one inch.

Cogongrass is difficult to contain mainly because it is highly adaptive to harsher environments, establishing itself on soils low in fertility. The grass can also grow on sand and clay. It is not eaten by many species of animal, further contributing to containment difficulties. The grass tends to be averse to dense shade, but reports indicate more shade-tolerant strains are developing.

The legume vine Mucuna pruriens is used in the countries of Benin and Vietnam as a biological control for Imperata cylindrica.

=== Flammability ===
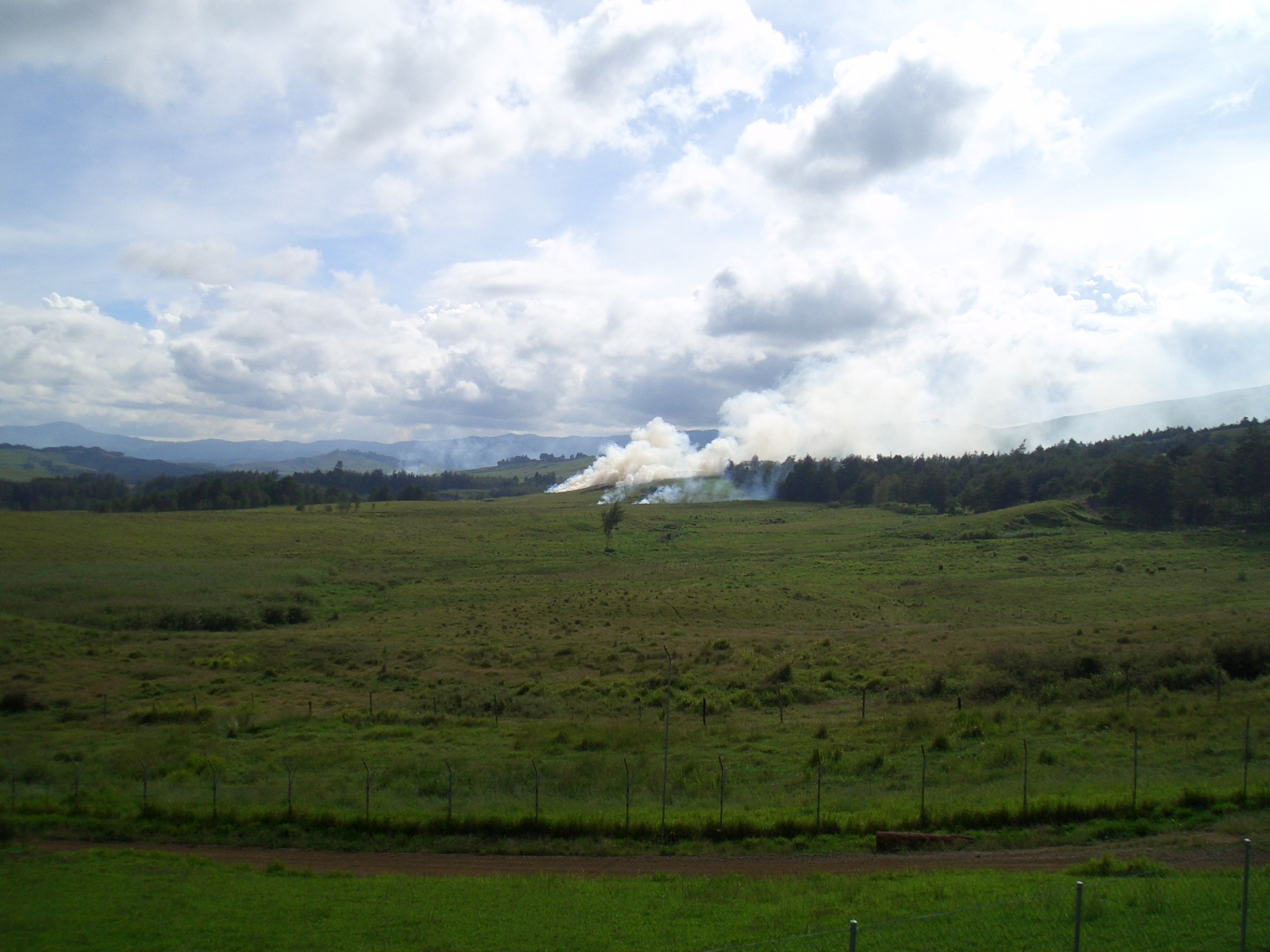
Green cogongrass on fire in Papua New Guinea

Cogongrass is a pyrophyte. It is highly flammable, even when still apparently green, particularly in tropical climates. It is not uncommon to see hillsides of cogongrass on fire. Cogongrass depends on regular fires to spread and maintain ecological dominance. Because of its density and high biomass, cogongrass provides a very high fuel load, enabling wildfires to burn faster, higher, and much hotter. This is hot enough to kill most competing plants, including trees. After a fire, cogongrass will recolonize the area using their rhizome network which was unaffected by the fire.

== Uses ==
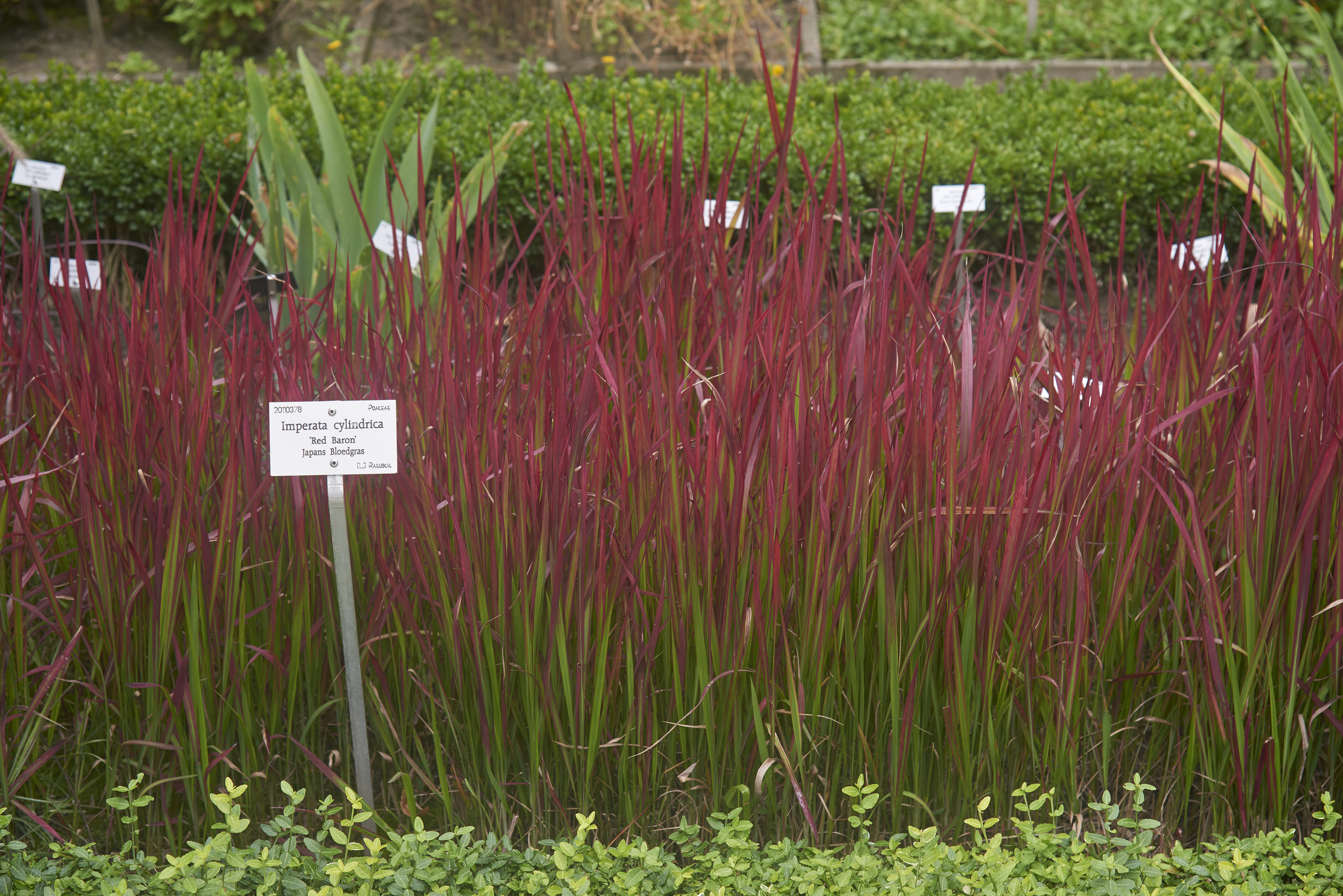
A Japanese bloodgrass cultivar, Imperata cylindrica 'Red Baron', grown as an ornamental

It is regarded as an excellent plant for thatching the roofs of traditional homes throughout south-east Asia, and is even grown as a crop for this purpose.

It is planted extensively for ground cover and soil stabilization near beach areas and other areas subject to erosion. Other uses include paper-making, thatching and weaving into mats and bags. It is used in traditional Chinese medicine.

A number of cultivars have been selected for garden use as ornamental plants, including the red-leaved 'Red Baron', also known as Japanese blood grass.

Young inflorescences and shoots may be eaten cooked, and the roots contain starch and sugars.

== In culture ==
A common expression in the Philippines is ningas kugon ('cogon brush fire'). It is a figure of speech for quitters, specifically people who show a fervent interest in a new project but lose interest quickly, in reference to the propensity of cogongrass to catch fire and burn out quickly. The concept is similar to, but distinct from, procrastination.
