= Spalletti =

Spalletti is a surname. Notable people with the surname include:

- Ettore Spalletti (1940–2019), Italian artist
- Gabriella Rasponi Spalletti (1853–1931), Italian feminist, educator and philanthropist
- Luciano Spalletti (born 1959), Italian footballer and football manager

== See also ==
- Palazzo Spalletti-Trivelli, in the center of Reggio Emilia, Emilia Romagna, Italy
