= Augusto Mussini =

Italian painter (1870–1918)

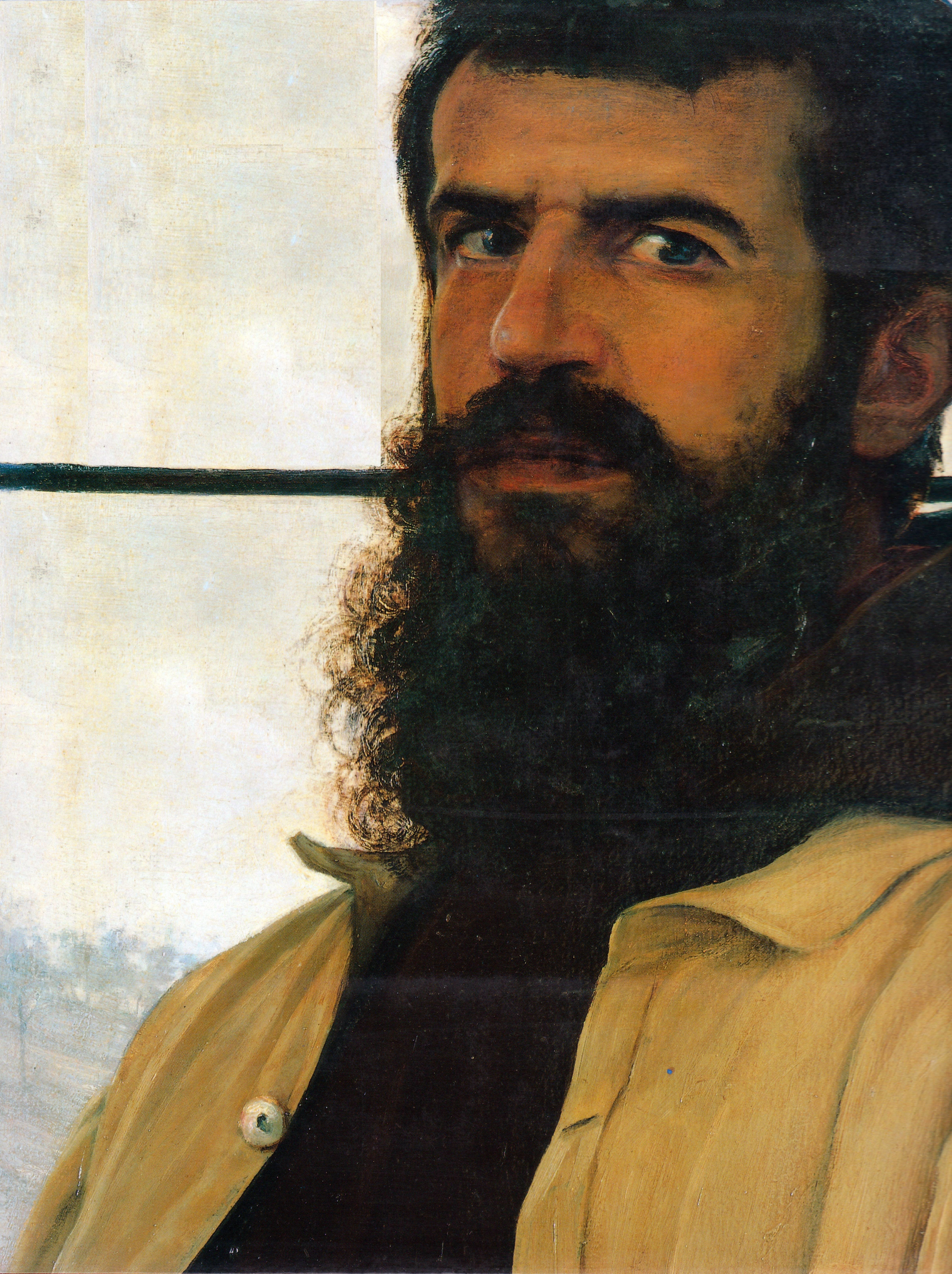
- Self portrait, Church of Cappuccini, Ascoli Piceno.
- Born: 9 January 1870; Reggio nell'Emilia, Italy
- Died: 1 November 1918 (aged 48); Rome, Italy

Augusto Mussini (9 January 1870 – 1 November 1918) was an Italian painter and friar.

== Life and career ==
=== Artistic formation ===
Born in Reggio nell'Emilia, Mussini studied at the Regia Scuola di disegno per operai, under Gaetano Chierici and Cirillo Manicardi, graduating in 1888. In 1890 he co-founded the association "Cooperativa pittori di Reggio Emilia", later becoming its artistic director. In 1892 he moved to Rome, where he studied at the Academy of France and attended the Scuola Libera del Nudo of the Accademia di Belle Arti. In 1893, thanks to a scholarship, he moved to Florence where he enrolled at the Accademia di Belle Arti di Firenze.

Starting from 1896 Mussini started exhibiting his works in important exhibitions, including the Venice Biennale, and worked for important patrons, including the Medici family. In 1903, he began collaborating with the journal Leonardo, under the pseudonym Augustus.

=== Escape and religious vocation ===
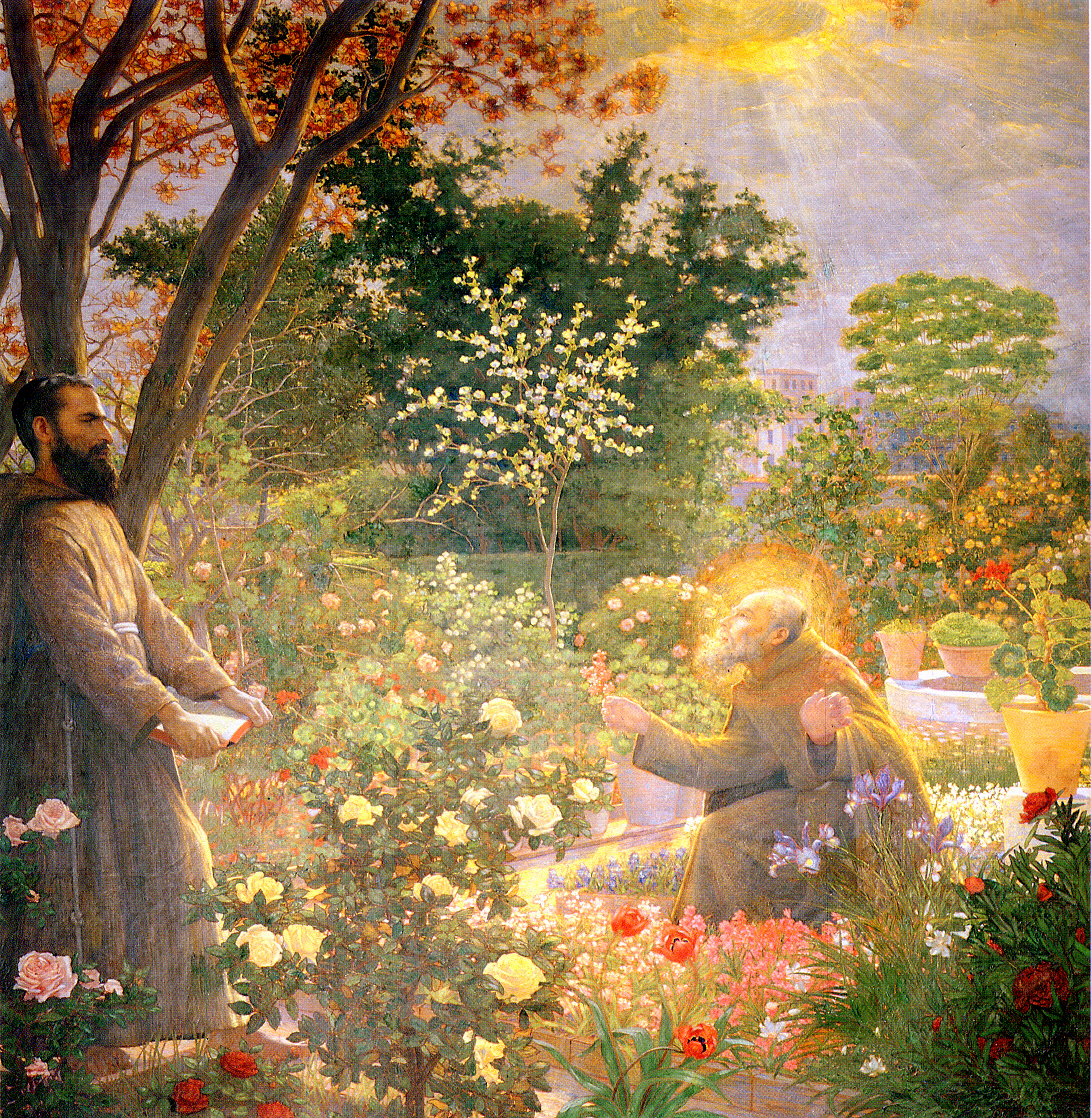
cult of flowers, fresco in church of Cappuccini of Ascoli Piceno

On 26 October 1903, Mussini disappeared from Florence, escaping from a duel with his best friend, the painter Giovanni Costetti, who had become his rival because of a woman, the painter Beatrice Ancillotti. On the way to the Austria, and after contemplating suicide, he got hospitality in a Capuchin monastery in Gorizia. He eventually moved to a Franciscan monastery in Trieste and then to the Franciscan monastery of Ascoli Piceno. There, after one year of in isolation and contemplative practices, in January 1905 he became a Friar, taking the name of Fra Paolo (Brother Paul). After the vows, he reprised his artistic activities, decorating various churches in the Marches, including the Church of Cappuccini where he realized a large mural illustrating the life of Seraphin of Montegranaro.
