= Kyryl =

Kyryl is a given name of Eastern European origin.

People with the name include:

- Kyryl Bielobrov (born 2000), Ukrainian ice dancer
- Kyryl Natyazhko (born 1990), Ukrainian basketball player
- Kyryl Pyrohov, weightlifter and medalist at the British International Open 2019
- Kyryl, a character in the 1992 Ukrainian novel The Moscoviad

== See also ==
- Kyryll Nesterenko (born 1993), Ukrainian badminton player and sports official, civil servant, and politician
- Kyryll Chudomirovich Flins, fictional character on the list of Genshin Impact characters
- Kyril
- Kyrylo
