= Beatrice Ancillotti Goretti =

Italian artist (1879–1937)

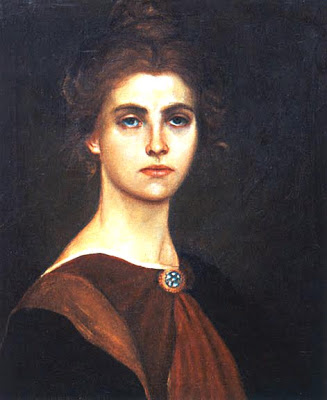
- Self-portrait of Beatrice Ancillotti Goretti
- Born: 1879; Florence
- Died: 1937 (aged 57–58); Pistoia

Beatrice Ancillotti Goretti (1879–1937) was an Italian artist who painted in the Renaissance tradition.

== Family ==
Beatrice Caterina Enrichetta Ancillotti Goretti was born in Florence in 1879 into a family of impassioned liberals. Her maternal grandfather, Demetrio Corgialegno (1785–1861), who had settled in Florence, came from an old and rich Byzantine noble family. He fought alongside the poet, Lord George Byron, during the Greek War of Independence. He established a secret organization aimed at overthrowing Ottoman rule, based in both Corfu and his hometown, Argostoli. Later, between 1838 and 1842, owing to his Tuscan connections, the Grand Duke of Tuscany, Leopoldo II, gifted him large quantities of books for the newly founded University of Athens.

In 1871, Goretti's future father, Torello Ancillotti (1843–1899), married her mother, Marianna Coriaglegno, known in the family as Demetria or Memi, with whom he would have two other children, Luisa, who died aged nine, and Demetrio, apart from Beatrice. Torello Ancillotti had met his wife through his friend and the son of Demetrio Corgialegno, Carlo, when, in 1859, they both joined Giuseppe Garibaldi during Italy's Third War of Independence. Awarded a silver medal for bravery during the conflict, when he returned to Florence, he was employed by the National Library of Florence. As a youth, he had studied at both the Accademia di Belle Arti di Firenze and that of Siena. He continued to paint, influenced greatly by the Macchiaioli, and in 1876 and 1877 held exhibitions in both Genoa and Turin.

Leaving his family behind in Florence in 1877, Torello Ancillotti moved to Rouen in France, where, during a liaison with the Countess of Barr, he began an intense and successful period of artistic activity as a painter, watercolorist, and sculptor.

== Relationship with painter Giovanni Costetti ==
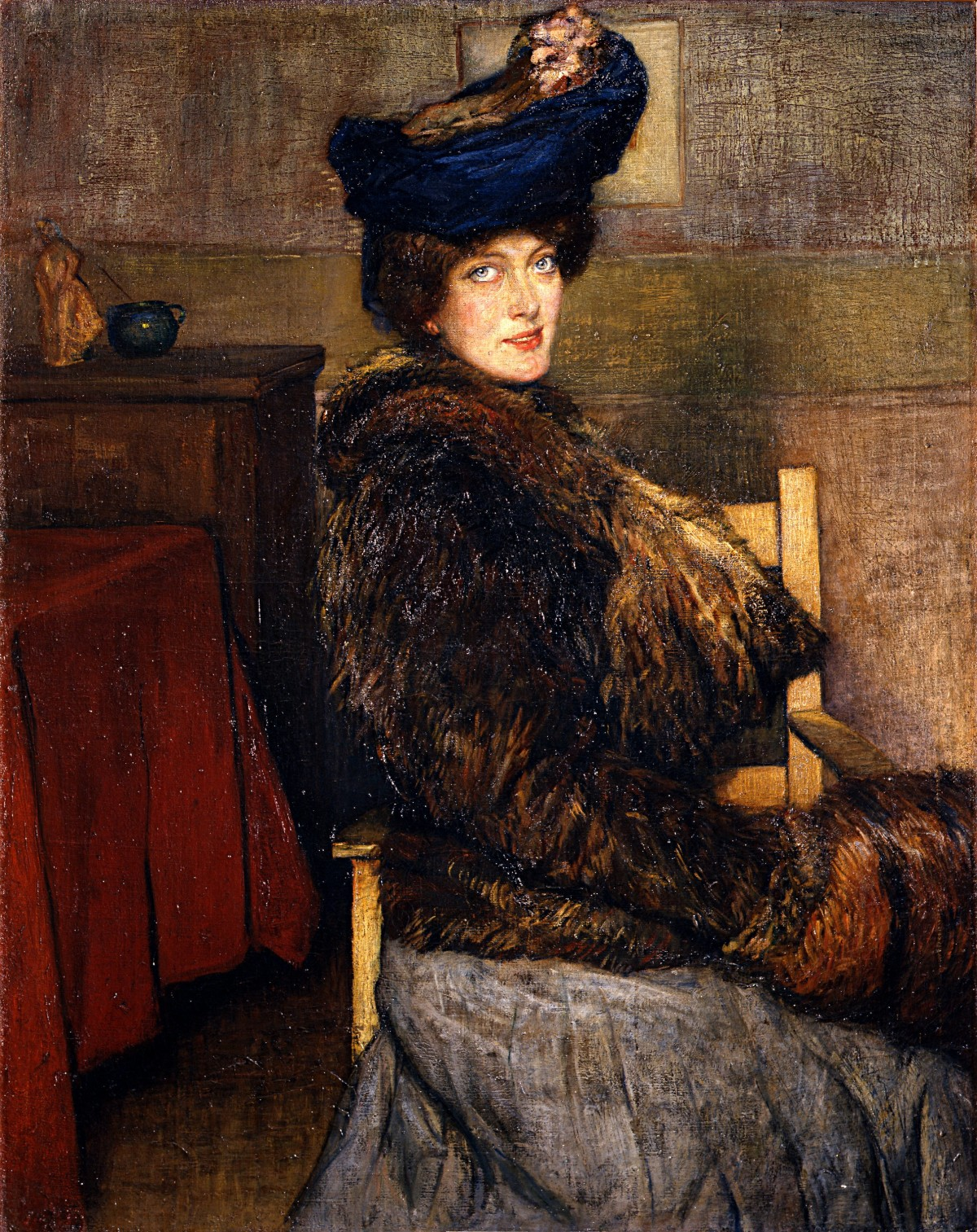
The Good Smile (Portrait of Beatrice Ancillotti) by Giovanni Costetti

Following in her father's footsteps, Goretti attended the Accademia di Belle Arti in Florence before taking advanced classes at Giovanni Fattori's Free School of the Nude. It was there that she probably met and started a love affair with fellow student and artist, Giovanni Costetti (1878–1949). He painted a portrait of her, entitled The Good Smile, found in the Modern Art Gallery of the Pitti Palace in Florence. In 1899, she also painted a portrait of him that hangs in the same gallery.

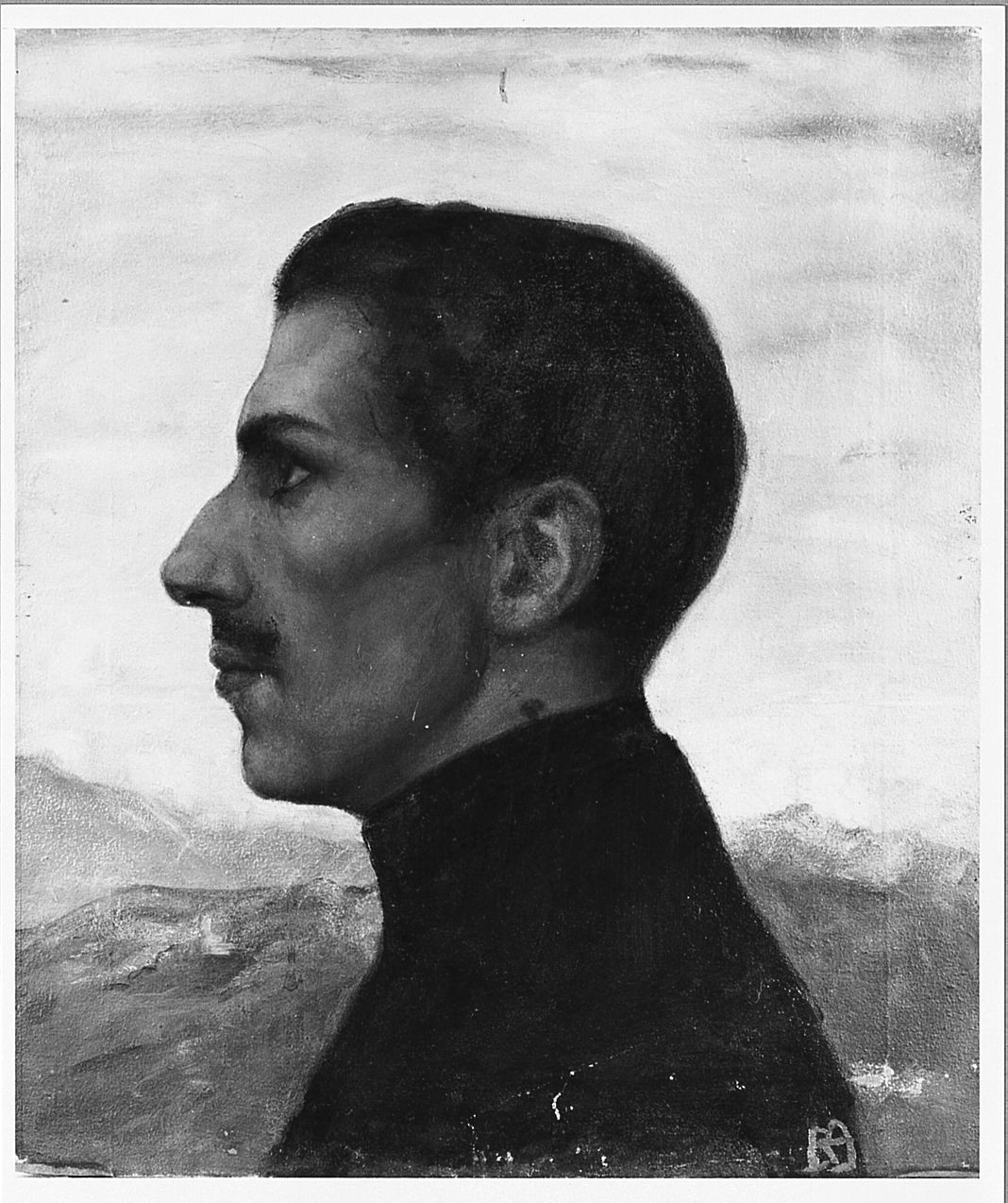
Portrait of Giovanni Costetti by Beatrice Ancillotti (1899)

In 1901, both artists took part in the 1901 Alinari Divine Comedy Competition, which involved preparing new illustrations for Dante's epic poem The Divine Comedy.

In 1903, Cosetti challenged a rival artist, Augusto Mussini (1870–1919), to a duel because he had become infatuated with Goretti. When Mussini disappeared from the city, he was feared dead. Instead, he had escaped from Florence to take refuge in a monastery in the north of Italy, where he became a monk, although he never pronounced his final vows.

That same year, Costetti reported two of Goretti's aunts to the police, accusing them of keeping her a recluse. Before leaving Florence after she had ended the affair, she made a statement before a public notary in which she said she had, of her own free will, refused to marry Costetti and strongly denied the rumor that she had been forced into seclusion by her relatives, declaring "I am an adult and no one can impose their will on me".

== Artistic legacy ==
Following her departure from Florence, she settled at Stellata, in the province of Ferrara. Here she met Andrea Goretti, whom she married in Fiesole soon after, on 22 February 1904. This was the same year she painted her Self Portrait which is amongst the 170 watercolors, pastels, and pencil drawings bequeathed by her only daughter, Maria Sara Goretti to the Modern Art Collection.

== Additional vocations ==
During World War I, she worked as a nurse, tending the wounded and the dying. In 1925, she became a Quaker, entering the Society of Friends of London; in 1932, she was a registered member of the Italian Trade Union of Women Professional Artists.

In 1937, Goretti, aged 58, died in Pistoia, a town about 35 kilometers northwest of Florence.

== Bibliography ==
- Giovanna Delcorno, Maria Sara Goretti, la sua vita, i suoi libri, «L'Archiginnasio», C (2005), pp. 519–540
- Patrizia Busi, Le carte di Maria Sara Goretti, «L'Archiginnasio», C (2005), pp. 541–566.
- Giovanna Delcorno and Patrizia Busi, Aeropoesia futurista e pedagogia : i libri e le carte di Maria Sara Goretti alla Biblioteca dell'Archiginnasio, [S.l.: s.n., 2005?], pp. 520–566 : ill.; 24 cm. (Estr. da: L'Archiginnsio, 100 (2005)
- Jane Fortune, Invisible Women: Forgotten Artists of Florence, Florence, The Florentine Press, 2009, ISBN 978-88-902434-5-5
- Maddalena Paola Winspeare, Donne & Colori: Artiste Nei Musei Statali Fiorentini – Women & Colours Women Artists in the Florentine State Museums, 2002, Sillabe, 2002, ISBN 9788883471100
