= Bernardino Cirillo Franco =

Roman Catholic archpriest (1500–1575)

Bernardino Cirillo Franco (20 May 1500 – 19 June 1575), also called Bernardino Cirillo and Cyrilo Franco, was a Roman Catholic archpriest of Loreto, Italy.

He was born in the city of L'Aquila, Italy on 20 May 1500. His father was Pietro Sante de' Cirilli, and his mother was Gemma Bucci.

He participated in the Council of Trent and was interested in improving Church music. He published litanies to the Virgin Mary. Cirillo advocated a return to the simplicity and harmony of the earlier forms of Church music rather than elaborate forms of organ music.

Cirillo attacked "modern" church music in a 1549 letter to Ugolino Gualteruzzi. In 1649, King John IV of Portugal wrote a treatise entitled Defence of modern music against the mistaken opinion of Bishop Cyrilo Franco [i.e., Bernardino Cirillo], presenting a point-by-point rebuttal of Cirillo's letter.

He died in Rome on 19 June 1575.

== Bibliography ==
- Cirillo, Bernardino (1570). Annali della città dell'Aquila, con l'historie del suo tempo [Annals of the city of L'Aquila, with the history of its time] (in Italian). Appresso Giulio Accolto.
