= Alessandro Prampolino =

Italian painter

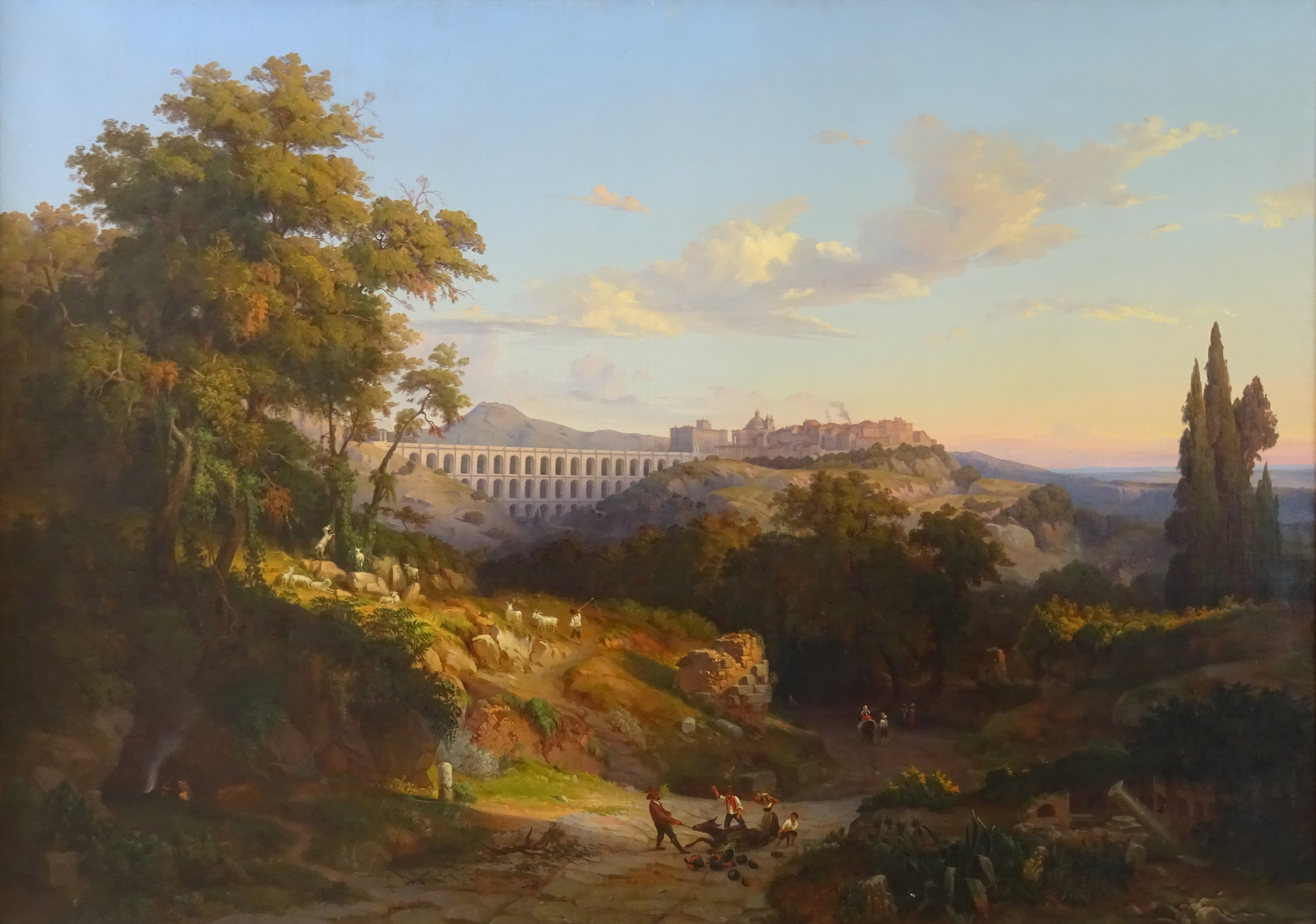
Alessandro Prampolino, Il ponte dell'Ariccia (Ariccia's Bridge), 1853 (Palazzo dei Musei, Reggio Emilia)

Alessandro Prampolino (1827–1865) was an Italian landscape painter. He is known chiefly by his views (vedute) of the neighbourhood of Tivoli and of the Roman Ruins. He was professor of painting in his native Reggio.
