= Marco Gerra =

Italian painter

Marco Gerra (27 September 1925 – 31 August 2000) was an Italian painter who became a prominent abstract painter.

== Biography ==
Marco was born in Reggio Emilia, and studied at the art academies of Reggio Emilia and Modena, becoming a pupil of Renzo Ghiozzi (Zoren). In Reggio Emilia, he met other painters such as Reggiani, Cesare Maccari, Felice Casorati, Corsi, Lojze Spazzapan, and Afro Libio Basaldella. He also attended the Academy of Fine Arts of Bologna in 1946, meeting Giorgio Morandi, Virgilio Guidi (companion in Venice during 1955), Mandelli, and Longhi.

In 1952 he had a personal exhibition at Reggio Emilia. In 1955 he was part of the Contestants at Quadrennial Exhibition in Rome where he got the Diomira Prize and Bevilacqua Prize in Venice. He returned to Reggio Emilia in 1958 where he began his art research in the informal field. By the 1960s, his works became abstract, colorful, and geometric. He died in Reggio Emilia. A community center in Reggio Emilia is named after the painter.
