= Christophe Cirillo =

French singer-songwriter

Christophe Cirillo is a French singer-songwriter performing in pop and chanson music genres.

== Career ==
After studying sociology, Christophe pursued a musical career and participated in the Rencontres d'Astaffort. Following this, he associated with Louis Chedid and signed a record contract with Universal Music under the pseudonym Monsieur Clément.

In 2005, his first album Monsieur Clément, produced by Albin de la Simone, was released with the single "Je n'ai jamais su". He gained attention from critics, including being described as a "new Souchon."

He released a second album in 2007, Comme un enfant, and opened for Calogero and Marc Lavoine.

Christophe left Universal and his pseudonym to join the participatory project My Major Company. With the help of online contributors, a third album Funambule was released in 2011.

Christophe also wrote for other artists, such as David Hallyday and Ariane Moffatt. In 2013, he co-wrote the song Les murs porteurs for Florent Pagny on the album Vieillir avec toi, composed by Calogero.

His fourth album, Cowboy désarmé, was released in 2015, and Christophe Cirillo opened at Calogero's tour.

== Discography ==
=== Singles ===
- 2005: Je n'ai jamais su
- 2006: A nous
- 2008: A part ça
- 2011: J'aimais mieux avant
- 2013: La beauté du geste
- 2015: Grand bien nous fasse

=== Collaborations ===
- 2007: Plus vent de toi, Sous les vagues – David Hallyday
- 2007: Grandeur nature – duet with Ariane Moffatt
- 2013: Les murs porteurs – Florent Pagny
- 2014: Fidèle – Calogero
