= Kyryll Nesterenko =

Ukrainian politician, entrepreneur and badminton player

Kyryll Oleksandrovych Nesterenko
- Нестеренко Кирилл Олександрович
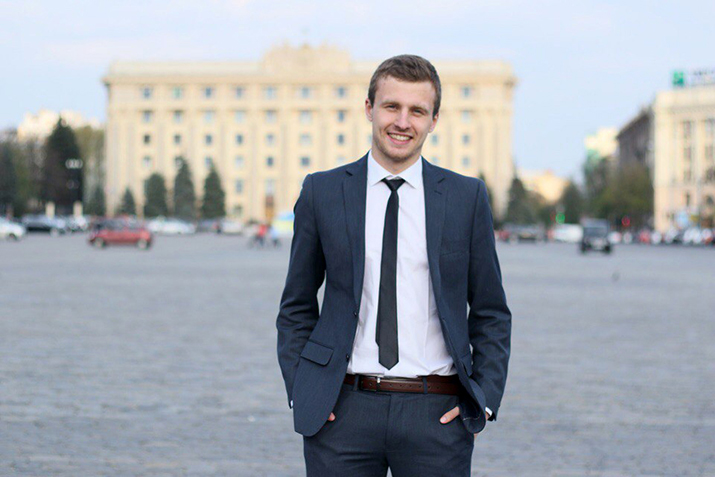
- Born: February 8, 1993 (age 33); Sumy, Ukraine
- Education: National Technical University Kharkiv Polytechnic Institute, Kharkiv National University of Internal Affairs
- Political party: Servant of the People

Kyryll Oleksandrovych Nesterenko (born February 8, 1993, in Sumy) is a Ukrainian badminton player and sports official, public figure, civil servant, and politician. He is a member of the Ukrainian Parliament of the 9th convocation.

== Biography ==
Nesterenko graduated from the National Technical University Kharkiv Polytechnic Institute with a degree in Sports Management and from the Kharkiv National University of Internal Affairs with a degree in law.

He attracted sponsors to finance the players of the Ukrainian national team's participation in the 2012 Olympic Games in London. He is a Master of Sports in the category of badminton. He is also the organizer of the public organization "Grenade," which is engaged in sports, charity, and education in Dnipro and Kharkiv.

In May 2019, Nesterenko launched the RUN OK flash mob, where running enthusiasts can run with professionals. Later, the initiative was renamed to Ze-motivator.

He worked as a development director at JSC "Dniprokomuntrans".

In 2019, Nesterenko was elected as a member of the Ukrainian Parliament from the Servant of the People party in the single-member electoral district No. 26 in Dnipro (Shevchenkivskyi district, part of the Tsentralnyi district, and Aviatorske of the Dnipro city council). At the time of the election, he was the development director of JSC "Dniprokomuntrans", non-partisan. He resides in Dnipro.

Member of the Committee of the Verkhovna Rada on issues of ecological policy, chairman of the subcommittee on state policy in the field of waste management.

On December 12, 2019, he joined the Interfactional Association "Humane Country", created at the initiative of UAnimals to popularize humanistic values and protect animals from cruelty.

During the 2020 local elections, he was suspected of having ties with the head of the Dnipropetrovsk Oblast Council, Sviatoslav Oliynyk, who is a friend and colleague of Ihor Kolomoyskyi.

== Sports career ==
He began his badminton career in 2004 at the Kharkiv Badminton Sports Club.

In 2010, he took 2nd place at the Grand Prix Europe stage in Turkey. In 2011, he took 3rd place in the team at the European Student Championships, 1st place in the Ukrainian Junior Championships, and was the absolute winner of the International Makariv Tournament.

He became the champion of Ukraine among juniors In 2012. In 2013, he won the Ukrainian Cup in badminton. In 2014, he won a bronze medal in the European Student Championships in the doubles category.
