= Giovanni Domenico Valentino =

Italian painter

Giovanni Domenico Valentino (Rome, c. 1630 – Imola, c. 1708) was an Italian painter of the late-Baroque, who specialized in a mix of genre and still life painting.

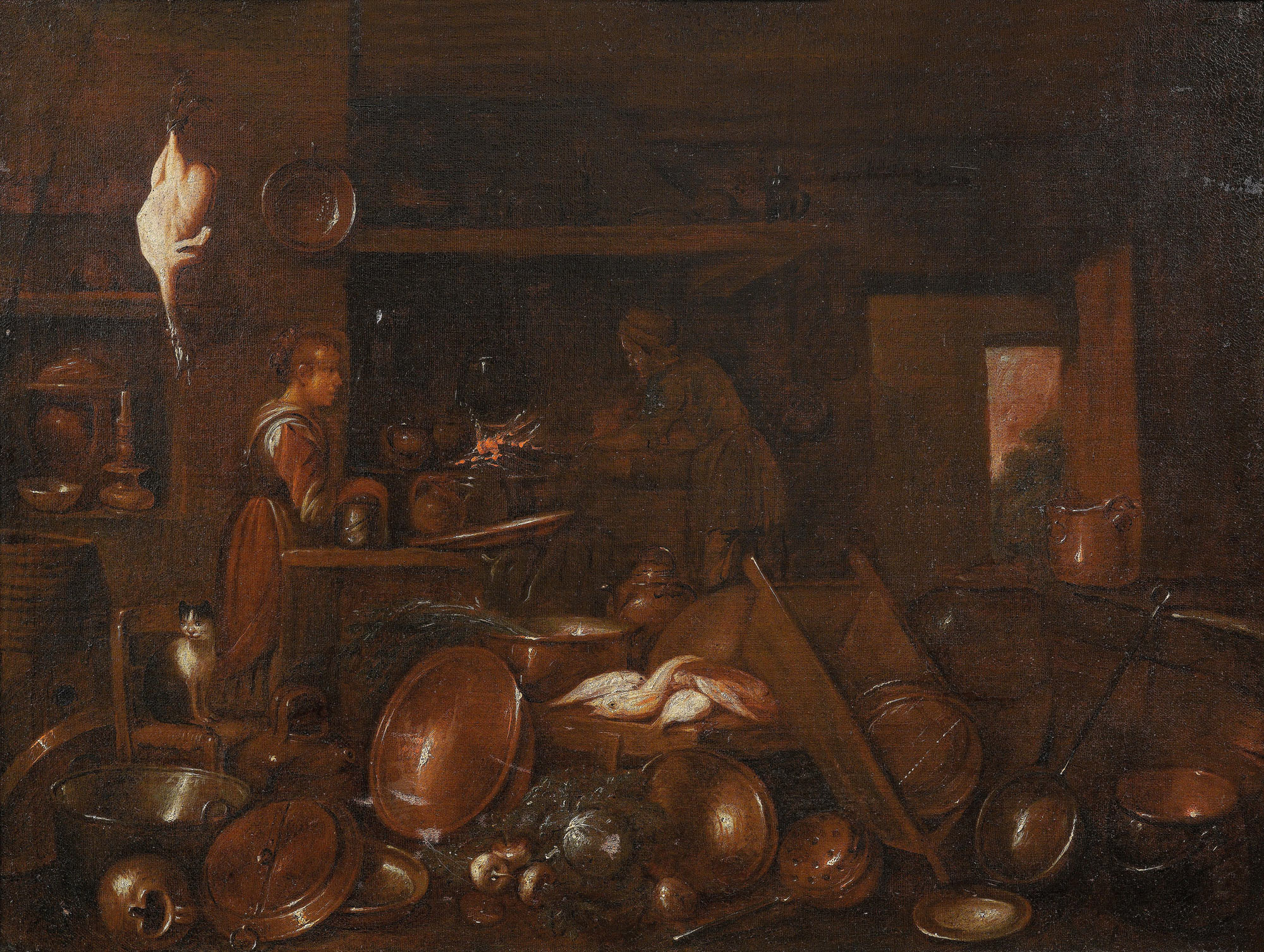
Interior of a kitchen (CREDEM collection held in the Palazzo Spalletti-Trivelli in Reggio Emilia)

== Sources ==
- CREDEM collection in Reggio Emilia
