= Ottorino Davoli =

Italian painter

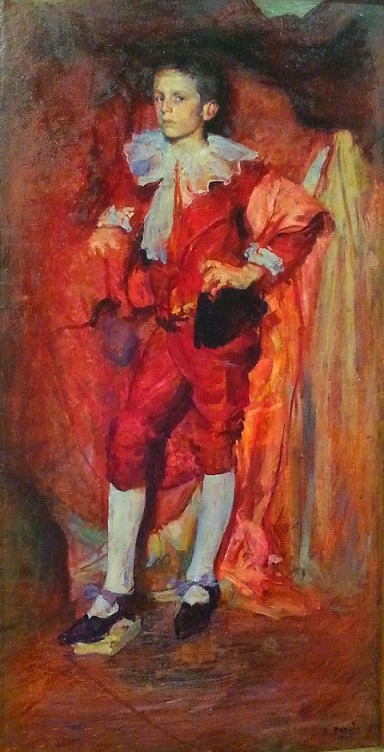
The Page

Ottorino Davoli (4 June 1888 – 7 December 1945) was an Italian painter and scenic designer.

== Biography ==
He was born in Reggio Emilia, and began his studies there. In 1903, he obtained a stipend from the istituto Ferrari Bonini to study at the Accademia di Brera. He had his first exhibit in Reggio in 1923, and an exhibit in Milan at the Galleria Vinciana in 1923. In 1924-1925 he became instructor of figure drawing and ornament at the Gaetano Chierici Design School in Reggio Emilia. In 1927–1928, he designed a controversial facade for the church of San Francesco in Reggio Emilia. In 1931, he painted a fresco at the Casa di Riposo per Mutilati di Reggio Emilia. In 1934, he became professor of ornamentation at the Liceo Artistico of Venice. He died in Venice.

== Bibliography ==
- Comune di Reggio Emilia, " Ottorino Davoli 1888-1945 ", a cura di G. Berti, E. Farioli, E. Prati, Reggio Emilia, Musei Civici, 2001
- Il Paggio di Ottorino Davoli torna a Reggio Emilia
