= Vincenzo Carnevali =

Italian painter

Vincenzo Carnevali (1779-1842) was an Italian painter and scenic designer.

== Biography ==
He was born in Reggio Emilia, and also trained in Milan. He helped decorate the Palazzo Spalletti-Trivelli in the historic center of Reggio Emilia. He worked with the engineer Giovanni Paglia in the Teatro di Reggio Emilia. One of his pupils was Antonio Fontanesi.
