= Cristoforo Munari =

Italian painter

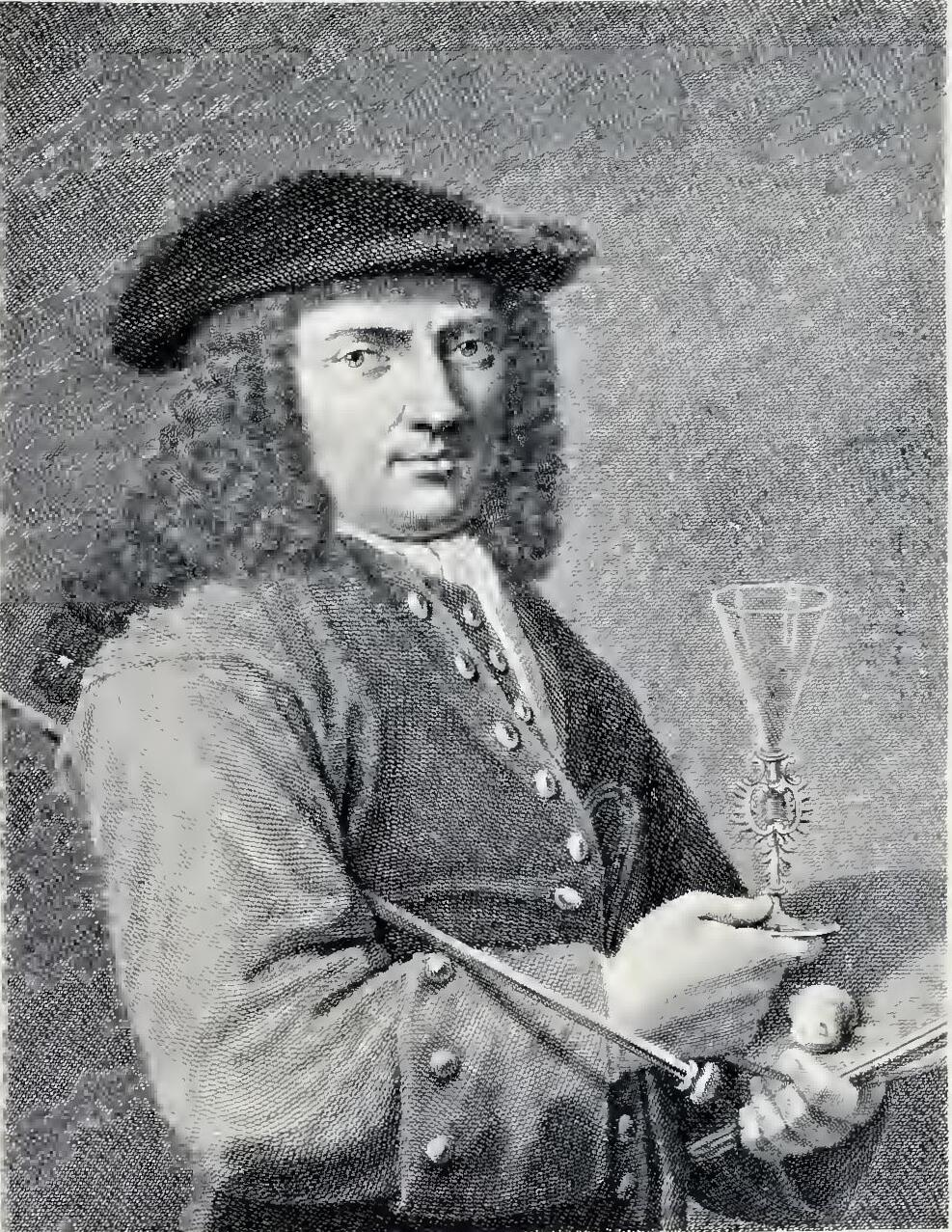
- Born: 21 July 1667; Reggio Emilia
- Died: 3 June 1720 (aged 52); Pisa
- Occupation: Painter

Cristoforo Munari (21 July 1667 – 3 June 1720) was an Italian painter in the Baroque period specializing in still life paintings. He was also known as Cristofano Monari.

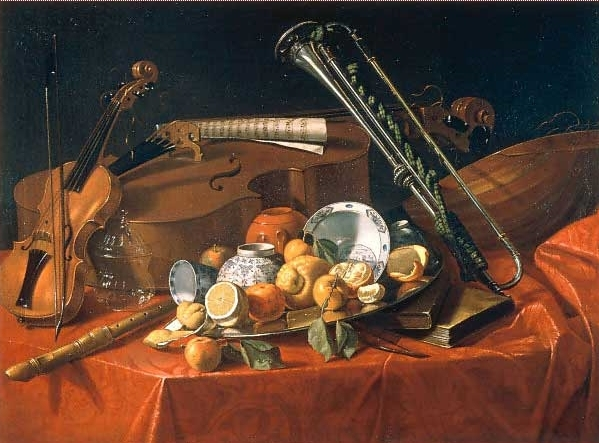
Still life with musical instruments and fruit (ca. 1703–1706)

His initial training was in Reggio Emilia, his birthplace, and he came under the patronage of Rinaldo d'Este, Duke of Modena. He lived in Rome from 1703 to 1706, then moved to Florence, where for about a decade he was attached to the court of the Medici. His still life paintings recall those of Evaristo Baschenis; however, the added disarray of porcelain, glass, and foodstuffs suggests the hangover from the jovial surfeit of the Medici court. He also painted panoplies and war trophies. In 1715, he moved to Pisa, where he worked almost exclusively in art restoration; he died in 1720.

An exhibition of his paintings took place in 1998 in Reggio Emilia, where it attracted wide attention and was a national success.
