= Pyrophyte =

Plant adapted to tolerate fire

Pyrophytes are plants which have adapted to tolerate fire.

Fire acts favourably for some species. "Passive pyrophytes" resist the effects of fire, particularly when it passes over quickly, and hence can out-compete less resistant plants, which are damaged. "Active pyrophytes" have a similar competing advantage to passive pyrophytes, but they also contain volatile oils and hence encourage the incidence of fires which are beneficial to them. "Pyrophile" plants are plants which require fire in order to complete their cycle of reproduction. Pyrophytes, while often considered being adapted to fire in general, are actually only adapted to the specific fire regimes in which they are found. Problems can arise if the fire regime of a pyrophyte is disrupted or changed.

== Passive pyrophytes ==
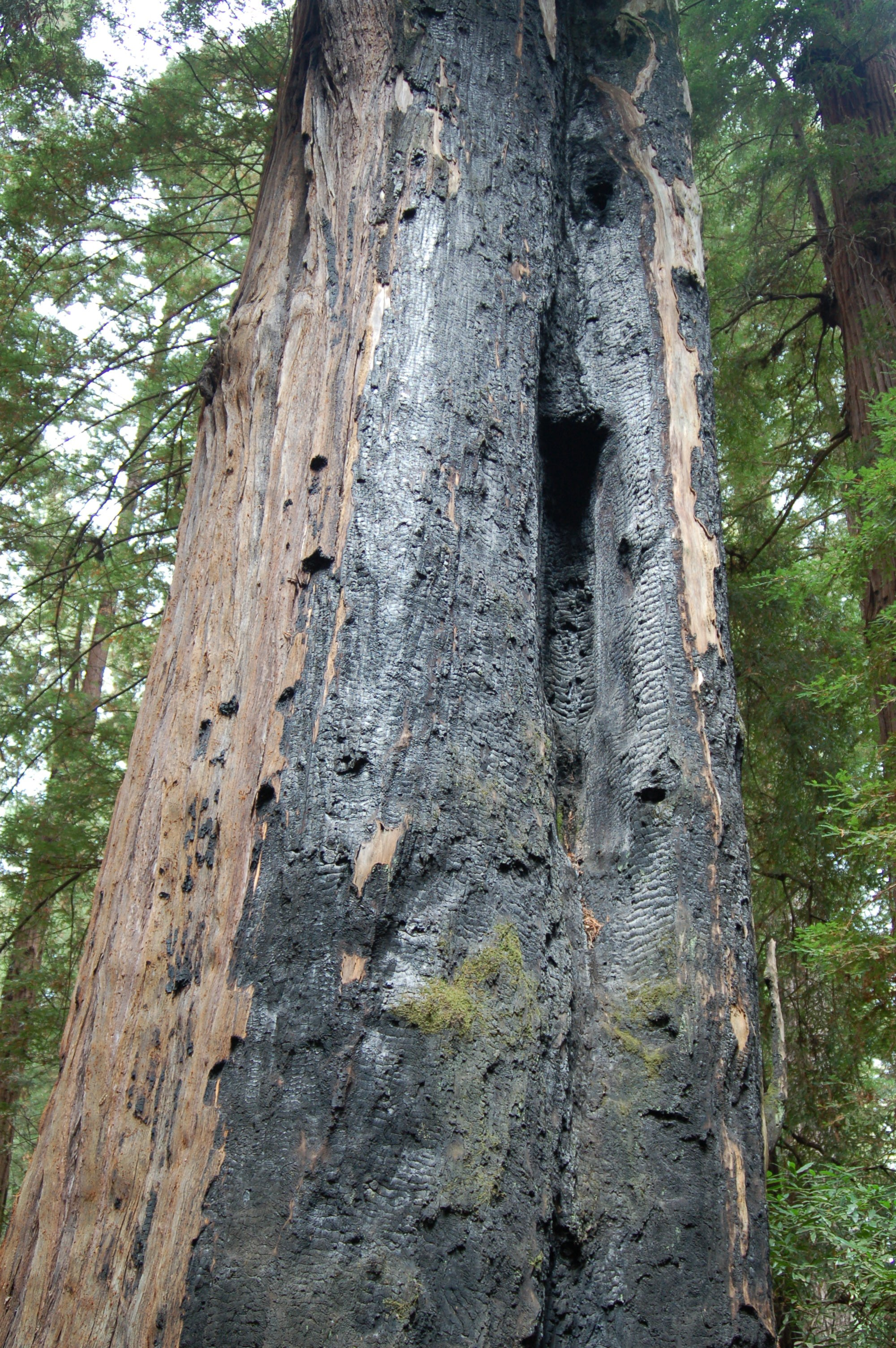
Sequoia sempervirens with reminders of a fire which happened over 100 years ago

These resist fire with adaptations including thick bark, tissue with high moisture content, or underground storage structures. Examples include:

- Longleaf pine (Pinus palustris)
- Giant sequoia (Sequoiadendron giganteum)
- Coast redwood (Sequoia sempervirens)
- Cork oak (Quercus suber)
- Niaouli (Melaleuca quinquenervia) which is extending in areas where bush fires are a mode of clearing (e.g. New Caledonia).
- Venus fly trap (Dionaea muscipula) – this grows low to the ground in acid marshes in North Carolina, and resists fires passing over due to being close to the moist soil; fire suppression threatens the species in its natural environment.
- White asphodel (Asphodelus albus)

For some species of pine, such as Aleppo pine (Pinus halepensis), European black pine (Pinus nigra) and lodgepole pine (Pinus contorta), the effects of fire can be antagonistic: if moderate, it helps pine cone bursting, seed dispersion and the cleaning of the underwoods; if intense, it destroys these resinous trees.

== Active pyrophytes ==
Some trees and shrubs such as the Eucalyptus of Australia actually encourage the spread of fires by producing flammable oils, and are dependent on their resistance to the fire which keeps other species of tree from invading their habitat. Today, many non-pyrophyte invasive plant species are able to invade fire adapted ecosystems as humans disrupt local fire cycles, raising questions about sustainable paths forward to preserve these ecosystems, their native biodiversity, and human based landscapes.

== Pyrophile plants ==
Other plants which need fire for their reproduction are called pyrophilic. Longleaf pine (Pinus palustris) is a pyrophile, depending on fire to clear the ground for seed germination.

The passage of fire, by increasing temperature and releasing smoke, is necessary to raise seeds dormancy of pyrophile plants such as Cistus and Byblis, an Australian passive carnivorous plant. The importance of smoke in germination has been directly linked to its production of trace gases, mainly nitrogen oxide (NO) and nitrogen dioxide (NO_{2}). These trace gases produced in wildfires share significant overlap with anthropogenic pollution, leading some to believe premature germination of pyrophiles through accidental human interference is possible.

Imperata cylindrica is a plant of Papua New Guinea. Evergreen, it ignites easily and causes fires on the hills.

== Evolution ==
99 million-year-old amber-preserved fossils of Phylica piloburmensis, belonging to the modern pyrophytic genus Phylica, show clear adaptations to fire including pubescent, needle-like leaves, further affirmed by the presence of burned plant remains from other Burmese amber specimens. These indicate that frequent fires have exerted an evolutionary pressure on flowering plants ever since their origins in the Cretaceous, and that adaptation to fire has been present in the family Rhamnaceae for over 99 million years.

== See also ==
- Fire ecology
- Serotiny
