= Cirillo Manicardi =

Italian painter

Cirillo Manicardi (9 December 1856 – 27 May 1925) was an Italian painter of oils and watercolors, mainly of genre interiors.

Manicardi was born in Massenzatico, today part of Reggio. In 1884, at Turin, he exhibited Così va il mondo!... In 1887 at the Exhibition of Venice, he displayed Church choir.
