= Kirill =

Kirill (Russian: Кирилл) a Russian male given name, an equivalent of Cyril, deriving from the Greek name Κύριλλος (Kyrillos), which in turn derives from Greek κύριος (kyrios) "lord".

Given names of the same origin include Cyrille, Cirillo, Cyrillus, Kiril, Kyril, Kyryl. Diminutives include Kiryukha, Kiryusha, etc. There are about 60 patronymic surnames derived from the name and its variants, including Kirillov Kirilov, Kirilenko, Kirilyuk, Kiryukhin.

Notable people with the surname include:

== Mononymous ==
- Kirill I of Moscow (born 1946), Patriarch of Moscow and all Rus'
- Kirill of Turov, Belarusian Eastern Orthodox bishop and saint
- Kirill Vladimirovich, Grand Duke of Russia

== Other ==
- Kirill Alekseenko (born 1997), Russian chess grandmaster
- Kirill Aleshin (born 1997), Russian ice dancer
- Kirill Alexeyev (born 1981), Russian ice hockey player
- Kirill "Kirka" Babitzin (1950–2007), Finnish musician
- Kirill Bichutsky (born 1984), American photographer, businessman
- Kirill Dmitriev (born 1975), Russian businessman
- Kirill Florensky (1915–1982), Russian geochemist and planetologist
- Kirill Formanchuk, Russian activist for motorists' rights
- Kirill Gerasimov (born 1971), Russian poker player
- Kirill Gerstein (born 1979), Russian pianist
- Kirill Gevorgian (born 1953), Russian diplomat and jurist
- Kirill Gorbunov (1822–1893), Russian painter
- Kirill Gurov (1918–1994), Russian theoretical physicist
- Kirill Ikonnikov (born 1984), Russian hammer thrower
- Kirill Kaprizov (born 1997), Russian ice hockey player
- Kirill Karabits (born 1976), Ukrainian conductor
- Kirill Khaliavin (born 1990), Russian ice dancer
- Kirill Kochubei (born 1986), Russian football player
- Kirill Kombarov (born 1987), Russian football player
- Kirill Kondrashin (1914–1981), Russian conductor
- Kirill Kondratyev (1920–2006), Russian atmospheric physicist
- Kirill Kononenko (born 1992), Russian ice hockey player
- Kirill Kravchenko (born 1976), Russian businessman
- Kirill Kurochkin (born 1988), Russian football player
- Kirill Lavrov (1925–2007), Russian actor and director
- Kirill Lyamin (born 1986), Russian ice hockey player
- Kirill Marchenko (born 2000), Russian ice hockey player
- Kirill Mazurov (1914–1989), Belarusian politician
- Kirill Meretskov (1897–1968), Russian general
- Kirill Molchanov (1922–1982), Russian composer
- Kirill Moskalenko (1902–1985), Russian general
- Kirill Nababkin (born 1986), Russian football player
- Kirill Naryshkin (1623–1691), Russian aristocrat
- Kirill Nikonorov (born 1990), Russian ice hockey player
- Kirill Pavlyuchek (born 1984), Belarusian football player
- Kirill Petrenko (born 1972), Russian-Austrian conductor
- Kirill Petrov (born 1990), Russian ice hockey player
- Kirill Pishchalnikov (born 1987), Russian basketball player
- Kirill Razumovsky (1728–1803), Russian aristocrat
- Kirill Reznik (born 1974), American politician
- Kirill Rodin (born 1963), Russian cellist
- Kirill Safronov (born 1981), Russian ice hockey player
- Kirill Seleznyov (businessman) (born 1974), Russian businessman
- Kirill Seleznyov (footballer) (born 1985), Russian footballer
- Kirill Shchelkin (1911–1968), Russian nuclear scientist
- Kirill Sosunov (born 1975), Russian long jumper
- Kirill Starkov (born 1987), Danish ice hockey player
- Kirill Stremousov (1976–2022), Ukrainian-born blogger
- Kirill Tomashevich (1852–1909), Russian politician
- Kirill Troussov (born 1982), German violinist
- Kirill Turichenko (born 1983), Ukrainian musician
- Kirill Vakhromeev, lay name of Philaret Vakhromeyev (1935–2021), Exarch of the Belarusian Orthodox Church
- Kirill Veselov, Russian ski-orienteer
- Kirill Yeskov (born 1956), Russian writer
- Kirill Yevstigneyev (1917–1996), Russian fighter pilot
- Kirill Zalessky (born 1980), Belarusian politician

== See also ==
- Kirill (web series)
