= 2021 Women's European Volleyball Championship squads =

This article shows all participating team squads at the 2021 Women's European Volleyball Championship, held in Serbia, Bulgaria, Croatia and Romania from 18 August to 4 September 2021.

== Pool A ==
=== Azerbaijan ===
The following is the Azerbaijani roster in the 2021 European Championship.

- Head coach:Vugar Aliyev
- 2 Yana Doroshenko S
- 4 Ilhama Aliyeva OS
- 6 Ayshan Abdulazimova MB
- 7 Olena Kharchenko MB
- 10 Anastasiya Mertsalova MB
- 11 Anastasiia Baidiuk OS
- 14 Kristina Besman S
- 15 Nilufar Aghazada MB
- 16 Yuliya Karimova L
- 18 Shafagat Alishanova S
- 19 Bayaz Aliyeva L
- 20 Margarita Stepanenko OP
- 21 Kseniya Pavlenko MB
- 22 Mariya Kirilyuk MB

=== Belgium ===
The following is the Belgium roster in the 2021 European Championship.

- Head coach: Gert Vande Broek
- 2 Elise Van Sas S
- 3 Britt Herbots OS
- 4 Nathalie Lemmens MB
- 5 Jodie Guilliams OS
- 6 Helena Gilson OS
- 7 Celine Van Gestel OS
- 9 Nel Demeyer L
- 10 Dominika Sobolska MB
- 13 Marlies Janssens MB
- 15 Jutta Van De Vyver S
- 17 Ilka Van de Vyver S
- 18 Britt Rampelberg L
- 19 Silke Van Avermaet MB
- 21 Manon Stragier OS

=== Bosnia and Herzegovina ===
The following is the Bosnia and Herzegovinan roster in the 2021 European Championship.

- Head coach: Stevan Ljubičić
- 1 Ajla Paradžik MB
- 2 Žana Dragutinović MB
- 3 Milana Božić S
- 4 Ajla Hadžić S
- 5 Tamara Đapa S
- 6 Ivana Radović OS
- 7 Anđelka Radišković OS
- 9 Edina Begić OS
- 10 Ela Klopić MB
- 11 Edina Selimović MB
- 12 Milica Ivković L
- 15 Dženita Rašidović L
- 16 Elena Babić OP
- 17 Dajana Bošković OP

=== France ===
The following is the French roster in the 2021 European Championship.

- Head coach: Emile Rousseaux
- 1 Héléna Cazaute OS
- 3 Amandine Giardino L
- 9 Nina Stojiljkovic S
- 11 Lucille Gicquel OS
- 12 Isaline Sager-Weider MB
- 15 Amandha Marine Sylves MB
- 21 Eva Elouga MB
- 34 Lisa Arbos OS
- 38 Leïa Ratahiry OS
- 63 Émilie Respaut S
- 81 Jade Defraeye MB
- 88 Amélie Rotar OS
- 91 Halimatou Bah OS
- 99 Juliette Gelin L

=== Russia ===
The following is the Russian roster in the 2021 European Championship. The Russian roster was revamped following the 2020 Summer Olympics to rest key players on the Olympic team.

- Head coach: Sergio Busato
- 1 Elizaveta Kotova MB
- 4 Daria Pilipenko L
- 5 Polina Matveeva S
- 10 Arina Fedorovtseva OS
- 11 Yulia Brovkina MB
- 12 Anna Lazareva OP
- 13 Yevgeniya Startseva S
- 17 Tatiana Kadochkina OP
- 22 Tamara Zaytseva L
- 23 Irina Kapustina OS
- 25 Ksenia Smirnova OS
- 26 Ekaterina Enina MB

=== Serbia ===
The following is the Serbian roster in the 2021 European Championship.

- Head coach: Zoran Terzić
- 1 Bianka Buša OS
- 2 Katarina Lazović OS
- 3 Sara Carić OP
- 5 Mina Popović MB
- 8 Slađana Mirković S
- 10 Maja Ognjenović S
- 11 Stefana Veljković MB
- 13 Ana Bjelica OS
- 16 Milena Rašić MB
- 17 Silvija Popović L
- 18 Tijana Bošković OP
- 19 Bojana Milenković OS
- 20 Jelena Blagojević L
- 21 Jovana Kocić MB

== Pool B ==
=== Bulgaria ===
The following is the Bulgarian roster in the 2021 European Championship.

- Head coach: Ivan Petkov
- 1 Gergana Dimitrova OS
- 2 Nasya Dimitrova MB
- 4 Eva Yaneva OS
- 6 Miroslava Paskova OS
- 7 Lora Kitipova S
- 8 Petya Barakova S
- 9 Borislava Saykova MB
- 10 Mira Todorova MB
- 11 Hristina Vuchkova MB
- 14 Emiliya Dimitrova OP
- 15 Zhana Todorova L
- 16 Elitsa Vasileva OS
- 18 Galina Karabasheva L
- 19 Aleksandra Milanova OS

=== Czech Republic ===
The following is the Czech roster in the 2021 European Championship.

- Head coach: Ioannis Athanasopoulos
- 1 Andrea Kossanyiová OS
- 2 Eva Hodanová OS
- 3 Veronika Trnková MB
- 4 Gabriela Orvošová OP
- 5 Eva Svobodová OP
- 8 Barbora Purchartová MB
- 10 Kateřina Valková S
- 11 Veronika Dostálová L
- 12 Michaela Mlejnková OS
- 14 Adéla Chevalierová L
- 15 Magdaléna Jehlářová MB
- 18 Pavlína Šimáňová MB
- 19 Petra Kojdová OS
- 23 Simona Bajusz S

=== Germany ===
The following is the German roster in the 2021 European Championship.

- Head coach: Felix Koslowski
- 1 Linda Bock L
- 2 Pia Kästner S
- 4 Denise Imoudu S
- 6 Jennifer Janiska OS
- 8 Kimberly Drewniok OP
- 9 Lina Alsmeier OS
- 10 Lena Stigrot OS
- 11 Louisa Lippmann OP
- 12 Hanna Orthmann OS
- 14 Marie Schölzel MB
- 16 Lea Ambrosius MB
- 17 Anna Pogany L
- 21 Camilla Weitzel MB
- 22 Monique Strubbe MB

=== Greece ===
The following is the Greek roster in the 2021 European Championship.

- Head coach: Guillermo Naranjo Hernandez
- 1 Aikaterina Giota MB
- 2 Maria-Eleni Artakianou L
- 3 Sofia Kosma OS
- 4 Olga Vergidou S
- 6 Martha Evdokia Anthouli OP
- 7 Georgia Lamprousi MB
- 8 Panagiota Rogka L
- 9 Olga Strantzali OS
- 10 Ioanna-Lamprini Polynopoulou MB
- 11 Anthí Vasilantonáki OP
- 12 Evangelia Chantava OS
- 14 Styliani Christodoulou S
- 20 Konstantina Vlachaki OS
- 22 Angeliki-Melina Emmanouilidou OS

=== Poland ===
The following is the Polish roster in the 2021 European Championship.

- Head coach: Jacek Nawrocki
- 1 Julia Nowicka S
- 2 Martyna Grajber OS
- 3 Klaudia Alagierska MB
- 8 Maria Stenzel L
- 9 Magdalena Stysiak OP
- 10 Zuzanna Efimienko-Młotkowska MB
- 11 Martyna Łukasik OP
- 13 Monika Jagła L
- 16 Marta Ziółkowska MB
- 17 Malwina Smarzek OP
- 19 Monika Fedusio OS
- 20 Martyna Czyrniańska OS
- 26 Katarzyna Wenerska S
- 88 Zuzanna Górecka OS

=== Spain ===
The following is the Spanish roster in the 2021 European Championship.

- Head coach: Pascual Saurin
- 4 Lucia Prol OS
- 5 Alba Sanchez L
- 6 Lucrecia Castellano MB
- 7 Carmen Unzue MB
- 9 Elia Rodriguez Villanueva S
- 10 Inmaculada Lavado Fernandez MB
- 11 Carolina Camino Fernandez OS
- 12 Lucia Varela Gomez MB
- 13 Patricia Llabrés L
- 16 Maria Segura Palleres OS
- 17 Ana Escamilla OS
- 20 Raquel Montoro OP
- 23 Denia Bravo Culebra OP
- 24 María Alejandra Alvarez S

== Pool C ==
=== Belarus ===
The following is the Belarusian roster in the 2021 European Championship.

- Head coach: Stanislav Salikov
- 1 Viktoryia Panasenka L
- 3 Nadzeya Stoliar MB
- 4 Anastasiya Kananovich S
- 6 Anastasiya Harelik OP
- 7 Alena Fedarynchyk L
- 8 Katsiaryna Sakolchyk OS
- 9 Nadzeya Vladyka MB
- 11 Hanna Klimets OP
- 15 Tatsiana Markevich OS
- 16 Vera Kastsiuchyk OP
- 17 Anastasiya Lapato S
- 18 Hanna Davyskiba OS
- 20 Darya Valadzko MB
- 21 Alena Laziuk MB

=== Croatia ===
The following is the Croatian roster in the 2021 European Championship.

- Head coach: Daniele Santarelli
- 1 Rene Sain L
- 3 Ema Strunjak MB
- 4 Božana Butigan MB
- 5 Nikolina Božičević L
- 6 Klara Perić S
- 9 Lucija Mlinar OS
- 10 Matea Ikić OS
- 12 Beta Dumančić MB
- 13 Samanta Fabris OP
- 14 Martina Šamadan MB
- 16 Laura Miloš OS
- 17 Lea Deak S
- 18 Karla Klarić OS
- 20 Dinka Kulić OP

=== Hungary ===
The following is the Hungarian roster in the 2021 European Championship.

- Head coach: Jakub Głuszak
- 1 Gréta Szakmáry OS
- 2 Fruzsina Tóth L
- 3 Adrienn Vezsenyi OP
- 4 Fanni Bagyinka S
- 7 Kata Török OS
- 8 Zsuzsanna Király-Tálas S
- 9 Dalma Juhár L
- 10 Kinga Szűcs OS
- 11 Orsolya Papp MB
- 13 Anett Németh OP
- 14 Zsófia Gyimes MB
- 16 Ágnes Pallag OS
- 18 Eszter Anna Pekárik MB
- 19 Gréta Kiss OS

=== Italy ===
The following is the Italian roster in the 2021 European Championship.

- Head coach: Davide Mazzanti
- 3 Alessia Gennari OS
- 4 Sara Bonifacio MB
- 5 Ofelia Malinov S
- 6 Monica De Gennaro L
- 8 Alessia Orro S
- 10 Cristina Chirichella MB
- 11 Anna Danesi MB
- 13 Sarah Fahr MB
- 14 Elena Pietrini OS
- 15 Sylvia Nwakalor OS
- 17 Miriam Sylla OS
- 18 Paola Egonu OP
- 20 Beatrice Parrocchiale L
- 24 Alessia Mazzaro MB
- 29 Sofia D'Odorico OS

=== Slovakia ===
The following is the Slovakian roster in the 2021 European Championship.

- Head coach: Marco Fenoglio
- 1 Michaela Abrhámová MB
- 2 Barbora Koseková S
- 6 Karin Palgutová OS
- 7 Michaela Španková L
- 9 Jaroslava Pencová MB
- 10 Ema Smiešková MB
- 11 Skarleta Jančová L
- 12 Nikola Radosová OS
- 13 Romana Krišková OP
- 14 Tereza Hrušecká MB
- 15 Karolína Fričová OS
- 16 Anna Kohútová S
- 18 Karin Šunderlíková OP
- 22 Maria Žernovič OS

=== Switzerland ===
The following is the Swiss roster in the 2021 European Championship.

- Head coach: Saskia van Hintum
- 2 Korina Perkovac OS
- 3 Nicole Eiholzer OP
- 5 Thays Deprati L
- 6 Madlaina Matter MB
- 7 Méline Pierret S
- 8 Samira Sulser MB
- 9 Sarina Wieland OS
- 10 Sarah Van Rooij OS
- 11 Maja Storck OP
- 13 Oriane Hämmerli S
- 14 Laura Künzler OS
- 16 Flavia Knutti L
- 19 Godeliv Schwarz MB
- 20 Léa Zurlinden MB

== Pool D ==
=== Finland ===
The following is the Finnish roster in the 2021 European Championship.

- Head coach: Tapio Kangasniemi
- 2 Anna Czakan MB
- 3 Katja Kylmäaho S
- 5 Suvi Kokkonen OS
- 6 Krista Bjerregard-Madsen MB
- 7 Emmi Riikilä OS
- 8 Kaisa Alanko S
- 11 Salla Karhu OS
- 12 Piia Korhonen OP
- 13 Ronja Heikkiniemi OS
- 15 Daniela Öhman MB
- 16 Netta Laaksonen L
- 17 Laura Penttilä L
- 20 Rosa Bjärregård-Madsen OP
- 21 Georgia Andrikopoulou OP

=== Netherlands ===
The following is the Dutch roster in the 2021 European Championship.

- Head coach: Avital Selinger
- 1 Kirsten Knip L
- 4 Celeste Plak OS
- 6 Maret Grothues OS
- 7 Juliët Lohuis MB
- 8 Demi Korevaar MB
- 9 Myrthe Schoot L
- 11 Anne Buijs OS
- 12 Britt Bongaerts S
- 14 Laura Dijkema S
- 16 Indy Baijens MB
- 18 Marrit Jasper OS
- 19 Nika Daalderop OS
- 23 Eline Timmerman MB
- 26 Elles Dambrink OP

=== Romania ===
The following is the Romanian roster in the 2021 European Championship.

- Head coach: Luciano Pedullà
- 1 Diana Ariton MB
- 3 Rodica Buterez OS
- 4 Diana Balintoni S
- 7 Petruța Orlandea MB
- 10 Denisa Ionescu MB
- 11 Maria Matei OS
- 12 Sorina Miclăuș OS
- 13 Alexandra Ciucu L
- 14 Alexia Căruțașu OP
- 15 Marina Cojocaru S
- 16 Andra Cojocaru L
- 19 Adelina Budai-Ungureanu OS
- 20 Georgiana Popa OS
- 23 Roxana Roman MB

=== Sweden ===
The following is the Swedish roster in the 2021 European Championship.

- Head coach: Ettore Guidetti
- 1 Elsa Arrestad MB
- 2 Sofia Andersson S
- 3 Linda Andersson MB
- 7 Sofie Sjöberg L
- 8 Dalila-Lilly Topic MB
- 9 Rebecka Lazić OS
- 10 Isabelle Haak OP
- 11 Alexandra Lazić OS
- 14 Hanna Hellvig OS
- 15 Diana Lundvall OS
- 16 Vilma Andersson S
- 17 Anna Haak OS
- 18 Julia Nilsson MB
- 21 Gabriella Lundvall L

=== Turkey ===
The following is the Turkish roster in the 2021 European Championship.

- Head coach: Giovanni Guidetti
- 2 Simge Şebnem Aköz L
- 3 Cansu Özbay S
- 4 Tuğba Şenoğlu OS
- 7 Hande Baladın OS
- 8 Yasemin Güveli MB
- 9 Meliha İsmailoğlu OS
- 10 Ayça Aykaç L
- 12 Buse Ünal S
- 13 Meryem Boz OS
- 14 Eda Erdem Dündar MB
- 18 Zehra Güneş MB
- 22 İlkin Aydın OS
- 95 Beliz Başkır MB
- 99 Ebrar Karakurt OS

=== Ukraine ===
The following is the Ukrainian roster in the 2021 European Championship.

- Head coach: Vladimir Orlov
- 1 Kateryna Dudnyk OS
- 2 Diana Meliushkyna MB
- 5 Bohdana Anisova OS
- 6 Krystyna Niemtseva L
- 7 Yuliya Gerasymova MB
- 9 Yuliya Boyko OS
- 11 Anna Kharchynska OP
- 13 Anastasiya Karasova L
- 14 Daria Velykokon S
- 16 Nadiia Kodola OS
- 17 Olga Skrypak S
- 18 Maryna Mazenko MB
- 24 Olesia Rykhliuk OP
- 33 Iryna Trushkina MB

== See also ==
- 2021 Men's European Volleyball Championship squads
