= Kirilyuk =

Kirilyuk or Kiriliuk (Ukrainian or Russian: Кирилюк) is a Ukrainian gender-neutral patronymic surname based on the Russian-language style Latinization of the surname, derived from the given name Kiril/Kirill (Cyril). The native Ukrainian Latinization of the surname is Kyrylyuk or Kyryliuk. The surname may refer to the following notable people:

- Alisa Kirilyuk (born 1990), Russian sailor
- Andrey Kirilyuk (born 1968), Soviet sailor
- Lina Kiriliuk (born 1996), Lithuanian long-distance runner
- Mariya Kirilyuk (born 1995), Azerbaijani volleyball player
- Oleksandr Kyrylyuk (born 1964), Ukrainian footballer

== See also ==
- Kyrylenko
- Kirilov
