= Alexander Kirillov =

Alexander Kirillov or Alexandre Kirillov may refer to:

- Alexandre Kirillov (b. 1936), Russian mathematician
- Alexander Kirillov, Jr., his son, Russian-American mathematician

== See also ==
- Kirillov
