= Kirillov =

Kirillov (masculine) or Kirillova (feminine or genitive of Kirill) may refer to:

- Kirillov (surname) (Kirillova), Russian last name
- Kirillov Urban Settlement, a municipal formation which the town of district significance of Kirillov and two rural localities in Kirillovsky District of Vologda Oblast, Russia are incorporated as
- Kirillov (town), a town in Kirillovsky District of Vologda Oblast, Russia
- Kirillova (rural locality), a rural locality (a village) in Irbitsky District of Sverdlovsk Oblast, Russia
