= Nikanorov =

Nikanorov (Russian: Никаноров) is a surname. Notable people with this surname include:

- Spartak Nikanorov (1923–2015), Soviet scientist
- Vladimir Nikanorov (1917–1980), Soviet footballer and hockey player

== See also ==
- Nikonorov, another surname
