= Volleyball at the 2021 Islamic Solidarity Games =

Volleyball competition

- Venue: Karatay Congress and Sport Center
- Dates: 8–15 August 2022

The volleyball competition at the 2021 Islamic Solidarity Games in Konya was organized between 8 August and 15 August 2022. The volleyball competition took place at Karatay Congress and Sport Center in Konya.

The Games were originally scheduled to take place from 20 to 29 August 2021 in Konya, Turkey. In May 2020, the Islamic Solidarity Sports Federation (ISSF), who are responsible for the direction and control of the Islamic Solidarity Games, postponed the games as the 2020 Summer Olympics were postponed to July and August 2021, due to the global COVID-19 pandemic.

== Medal table ==
Rank	Nation	Gold	Silver	Bronze	Total
1	Iran (IRI)	1	1	0	2
2	Turkey (TUR)	1	0	1	2
3	Cameroon (CMR)	0	1	0	1
4	Azerbaijan (AZE)	0	0	1	1
Totals (4 entries)		2	2	2	6

== Medalists ==
Event	Gold	Silver	Bronze
Men	Iran; Fazel Pajouman; Esmaeil Mosafer; Mohammad Valizadeh; Arman Rahmani; Amir Reza Sarlak; Esmaeil Talebi; Mehrab Maleki; Shahrouz Homayounfarmanesh; Bardia Saadat; Ali Ramezani; Ehsan Daneshdoust; Abolfazl Gholipour; Ali Hajipour; Pouria Yali	Cameroon; Elie Badawe; Ahmed Awal; Arnaud Amabaya; Adam Brahim; Cédric Bitouna; Jérémie Deffo; Kevin Bassoko; Issa Ousseini; Yaoussia Landry; Yvan Kody; Yvan Owona; Christian Voukeng; Jordy Aye Fosso; Christophe Mandeng	Turkey; Kaan Gürbüz; Cafer Kirkit; Ahmet Samet Baltacı; Beytullah Hatipoğlu; Ahmet Tümer; Gökhan Gökgöz; Mehmet Hacıoğlu; Ediz Kaan Fırıncıoğlu; Burakhan Tosun; Burak Mert; İzzet Ünver; İzzet Alp Akkuş; Yunus Emre Tayaz; Orçun Ergün
Women	Turkey; Melis Yılmaz; İlkin Aydın; Emine Arıcı; Ezgi Akyaldız; Buket Gülübay; Aslıhan Kılıç; Ayçin Akyol; Buse Kayacan; Zeynep Sude Demirel; Yasemin Özel; Yasemin Yıldırım; Ceren Kapucu; Yaprak Erkek; İdil Naz Kanbur	Iran; Aytak Salamat; Zahra Karimi; Mohaddeseh Moshtaghi; Shabnam Alikhani; Mahsa Saberi; Maedeh Borhani; Mahsa Kadkhoda; Fatemeh Amini; Negar Kiani; Pouran Zare; Tahmineh Dargazani; Elaheh Poursaleh; Reihaneh Karimi; Zahra Moghani	Azerbaijan; Yelyzaveta Ruban; Odina Aliyeva; Ayshan Abdulazimova; Olena Kharchenko; Valeriya Kondratyeva; Nikalina Bashnakova; Anastasiya Mertsalova; Aynur Imanova; Kristina Besman; Yuliya Karimova; Shafagat Alishanova; Bayaz Aliyeva; Margarita Stepanenko; Mariya Kirilyuk

== Men ==
=== Preliminary round ===
==== Group A ====
Pos	Team	Pld	W	L	Pts	SW	SL	SR	SPW	SPL	SPR
1	Cameroon	3	2	1	7	8	3	2.667	255	220	1.159
2	Azerbaijan	3	2	1	6	6	4	1.500	232	220	1.055
3	Morocco	3	2	1	5	7	5	1.400	272	246	1.106
4	Sudan	3	0	3	0	0	9	0.000	152	225	0.676

Source: TVF

Date	Time		Score		Set 1	Set 2	Set 3	Set 4	Set 5	Total	Report
09 Aug	10:00	Sudan	0–3	Azerbaijan	13–25	20–25	22–25			55–75	Report
09 Aug	15:00	Morocco	3–2	Cameroon	25–20	24–26	18–25	25–22	15–12	107–105	Report
11 Aug	13:00	Sudan	0–3	Morocco	14–25	13–25	14–25			41–75	Report
11 Aug	19:00	Azerbaijan	0–3	Cameroon	19–25	23–25	15–25			57–75	Report
13 Aug	10:00	Sudan	0–3	Cameroon	17–25	22–25	17–25			56–75	Report
13 Aug	16:00	Azerbaijan	3–1	Morocco	25–20	22–25	28–26	25–19		100–90	Report

==== Group B ====
Pos	Team	Pld	W	L	Pts	SW	SL	SR	SPW	SPL	SPR
1	Iran	3	2	1	7	8	3	2.667	265	243	1.091
2	Turkey	3	2	1	5	7	6	1.167	315	317	0.994
3	Qatar	3	2	1	5	6	6	1.000	267	272	0.982
4	Pakistan	3	0	3	1	3	9	0.333	282	297	0.949

Source: TVF

Date	Time		Score		Set 1	Set 2	Set 3	Set 4	Set 5	Total	Report
09 Aug	12:30	Iran	3–0	Qatar	25–15	26–24	25–23			76–62	Report
09 Aug	17:30	Pakistan	1–3	Turkey	28–30	26–24	27–29	27–29		108–112	Report
11 Aug	10:00	Pakistan	0–3	Iran	18–25	26–28	18–25			62–78	Report
11 Aug	16:00	Turkey	1–3	Qatar	25–22	21–25	24–26	14–25		84–98	Report
13 Aug	13:00	Pakistan	2–3	Qatar	25–21	25–13	31–33	23–25	8–15	112–107	Report
13 Aug	19:00	Turkey	3–2	Iran	23–25	22–25	34–32	25–21	15–8	119–111	Report

=== Final round ===
Semifinals
14 August
Cameroon	3
Turkey	1
14 August
Iran	3
Azerbaijan	0

Gold medal match
15 August
Cameroon	1
Iran	3
Bronze medal match
15 August
Turkey	3
Azerbaijan	1

==== Semifinals ====
Date	Time		Score		Set 1	Set 2	Set 3	Set 4	Set 5	Total	Report
14 Aug	13:00	Iran	3–0	Azerbaijan	25–17	25–20	25–11			75–48	Report
14 Aug	16:00	Cameroon	3–1	Turkey	25–23	25–18	22–25	25–20		97–86	Report

==== Bronze medal match ====
Date	Time		Score		Set 1	Set 2	Set 3	Set 4	Set 5	Total	Report
15 Aug	10:00	Turkey	3–1	Azerbaijan	26–24	22–25	28–26	25–14		101–89	Report

==== Gold medal match ====
Date	Time		Score		Set 1	Set 2	Set 3	Set 4	Set 5	Total	Report
15 Aug	16:00	Cameroon	1–3	Iran	16–25	25–18	23–25	14–25		78–93	Report

== Women ==
=== Preliminary round ===
==== Group A ====
Pos	Team	Pld	W	L	Pts	SW	SL	SR	SPW	SPL	SPR
1	Turkey	2	2	0	6	6	0	MAX	150	83	1.807
2	Iran	2	1	1	3	3	4	0.750	153	150	1.020
3	Uzbekistan	2	0	2	0	1	6	0.167	106	176	0.602

Source: TVF

Date	Time		Score		Set 1	Set 2	Set 3	Set 4	Set 5	Total	Report
08 Aug	19:00	Turkey	3–0	Uzbekistan	25–13	25–3	25–15			75–31	Report
10 Aug	16:00	Uzbekistan	1–3	Iran	15–25	16–25	28–26	16–25		75–101	Report
12 Aug	19:00	Turkey	3–0	Iran	25–20	25–15	25–17			75–52	Report

==== Group B ====
Pos	Team	Pld	W	L	Pts	SW	SL	SR	SPW	SPL	SPR
1	Azerbaijan	3	3	0	9	9	1	9.000	257	119	2.160
2	Cameroon	3	2	1	6	7	3	2.333	227	189	1.201
3	Senegal	3	1	2	3	3	6	0.500	142	189	0.751
4	Afghanistan	3	0	3	0	0	9	0.000	96	225	0.427

Source: TVF

Date	Time		Score		Set 1	Set 2	Set 3	Set 4	Set 5	Total	Report
08 Aug	16:00	Azerbaijan	3–0	Senegal	25–7	25–6	25–10			75–23	Report
09 Aug	13:00	Afghanistan	0–3	Cameroon	16–25	7–25	15–25			38–75	Report
10 Aug	13:00	Afghanistan	0–3	Azerbaijan	4–25	11–25	4–25			19–75	Report
10 Aug	19:00	Senegal	0–3	Cameroon	16–25	17–25	11–25			44–75	Report
12 Aug	13:00	Cameroon	1–3	Azerbaijan	31–29	12–25	8–25	26–28		77–107	Report
12 Aug	16:00	Afghanistan	0–3	Senegal	22–25	8–25	9–25			39–75	Report

=== Final round ===
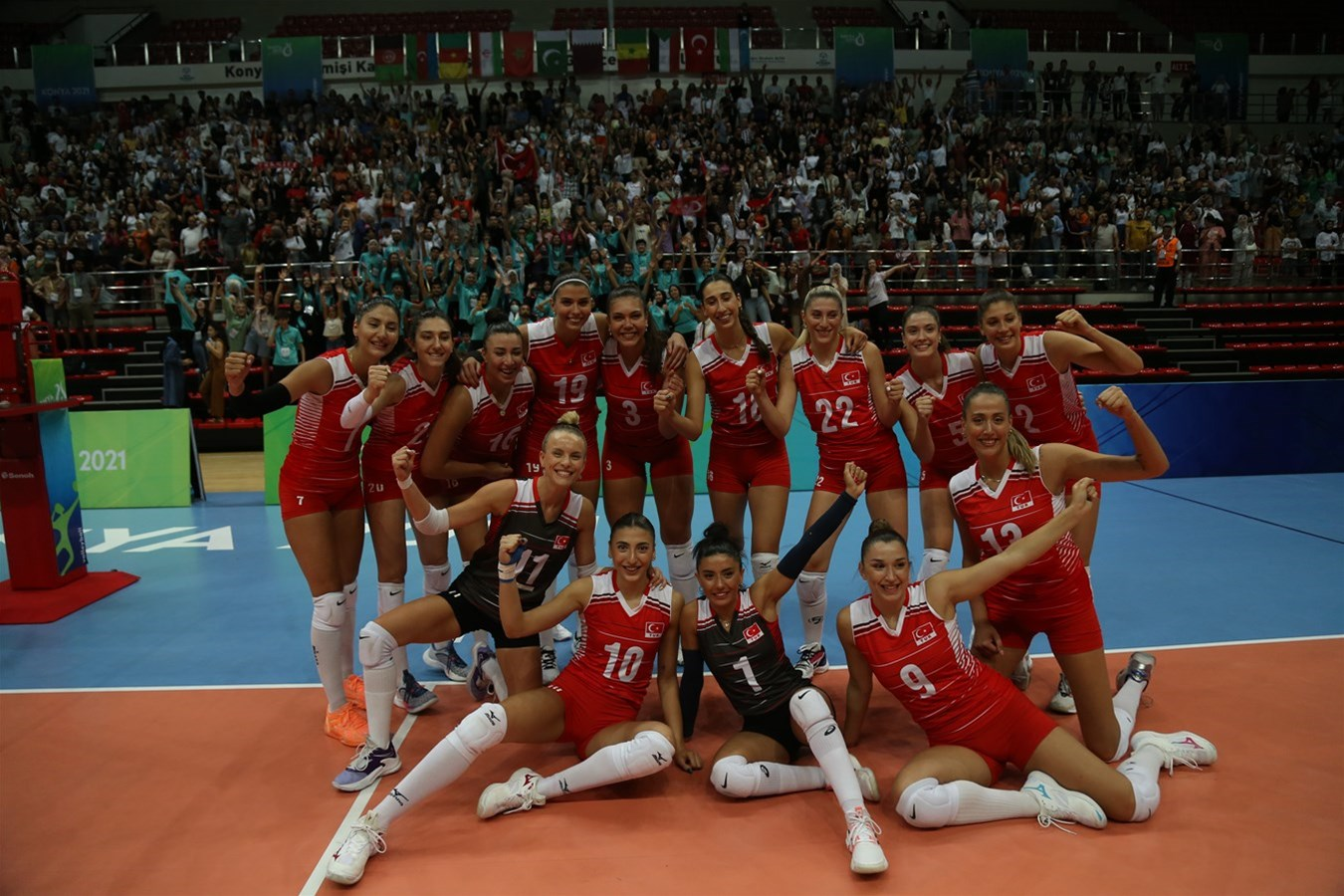
The champion Turkish team

Semifinals
14 August
Turkey	3
Cameroon	0
14 August
Azerbaijan	1
Iran	3

Gold medal match
15 August
Turkey	3
Iran	0
Bronze medal match
15 August
Cameroon	0
Azerbaijan	3

==== Semifinals ====
Date	Time		Score		Set 1	Set 2	Set 3	Set 4	Set 5	Total	Report
14 Aug	10:00	Azerbaijan	1–3	Iran	18–25	25–18	16–25	22–25		81–93	Report
14 Aug	19:00	Turkey	3–0	Cameroon	25–14	25–13	25–11			75–38	Report

==== Bronze medal match ====
Date	Time		Score		Set 1	Set 2	Set 3	Set 4	Set 5	Total	Report
15 Aug	13:00	Cameroon	0–3	Azerbaijan	25–27	13–25	17–25			55–77	Report

==== Gold medal match ====
Date	Time		Score		Set 1	Set 2	Set 3	Set 4	Set 5	Total	Report
15 Aug	19:00	Turkey	3–0	Iran	25–16	25–14	25–15			75–45	Report
