= Kirillovsky =

Kirillovsky (masculine), Kirillovskaya (feminine), or Kirillovskoye (neuter) may refer to:

- Kirillovsky District, a district of Vologda Oblast, Russia
- Kirillovsky (rural locality) (Kirillovskaya, Kirillovskoye), several rural localities in Russia

== See also ==
- Kirillov (disambiguation)
