= Nikonorov =

Nikonorov (Russian: Никоноров) is a Russian masculine surname, its feminine counterpart is Nikonorova. Notable people with the surname include:

- Boris Nikonorov (1939–2015), Russian Olympic boxer
- Kirill Nikonorov (born 1990), Russian ice hockey player

== See also ==
- Nikanorov, another surname
