= Yelyzaveta Ruban =

Ukrainian-born Azerbaijani volleyball player

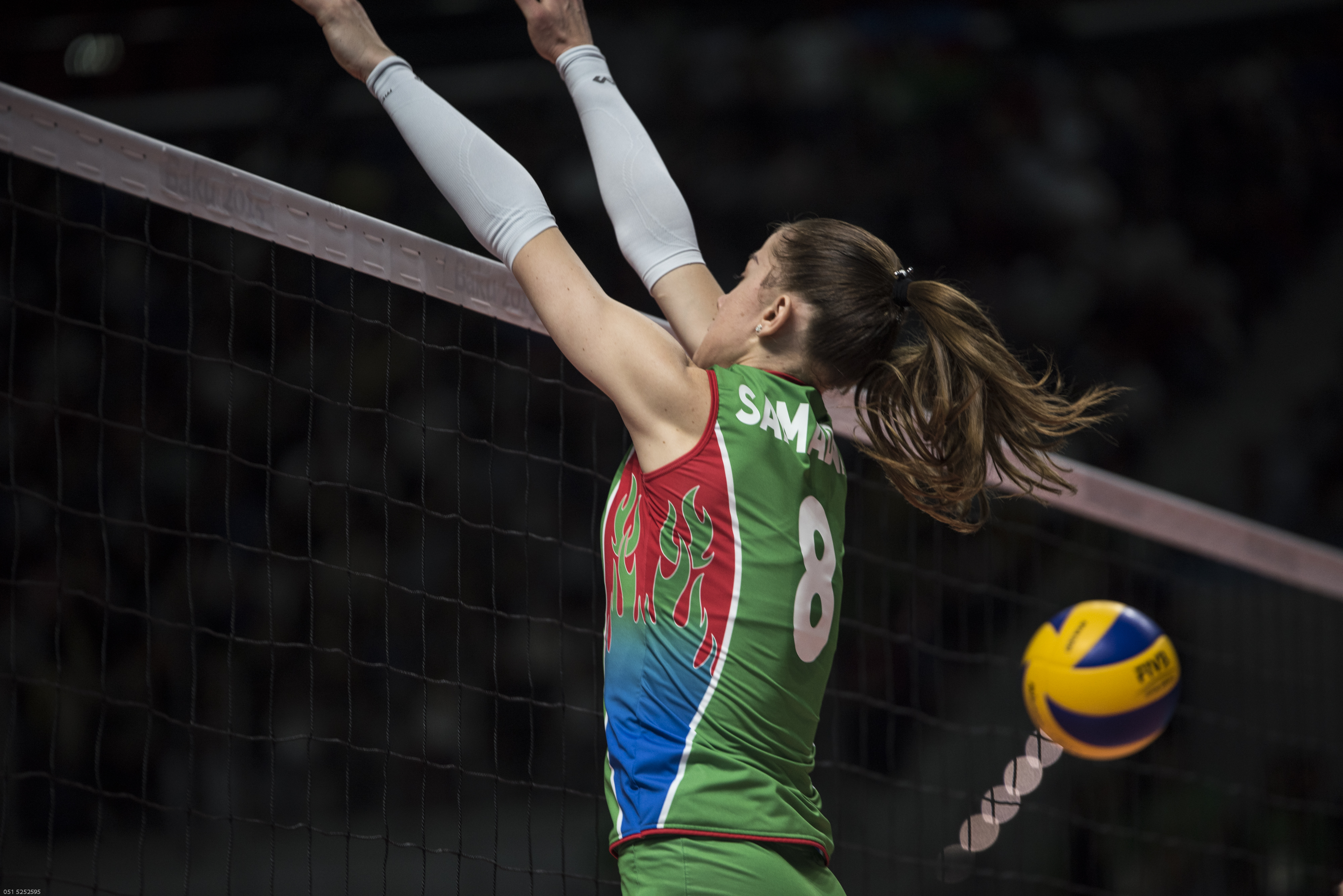

Personal information
- Full name: Yelyzaveta Ruban
- Nickname: Liza
- Nationality: Ukrainian; Azerbaijani
- Born: 3 March 1995 (age 31) Kharkiv, Ukraine
- Home town: Baku, Azerbaijan
- Height: 1.85 m (6 ft 1 in)
- Weight: 71 kg (157 lb)
- Spike: 310 cm (122 in)
- Block: 290 cm (114 in)

Volleyball information
- Position: Outside spiker
- Current club: Leningradka Saint Petersburg
- Number: 3

Career
- Years: Team
- 2014–2017 2017–2018 2018–2020 2021–2022 2022-2024 2024-2024 2025-present: (Azerbaijan) Telekom Baku (Italy) Pallavolo Scandicci (Russia) Leningradka Saint-Petersburg (Turkey) Bolu Belediyyespor (Romania) CSM Lugoj (Romania) CSM Volei Alba Blaj (Russia) Leningradka Saint Petersburg

National team
- Years: Team
- 2015–: Azerbaijan
Honours
Women's volleyball
Representing Azerbaijan
European League
Gold medal – first place	2016 Nitra	Team
Islamic Solidarity Games
Gold medal – first place	2017 Baku	Team
Bronze medal – third place	2021 Konya	Team
- Updated on 20 October 2026

Yelyzaveta Ruban, also known as Yelyzaveta Samadova (born 3 March 1995) is an Azerbaijani volleyball player who plays for Leningradka Saint Petersburg and Azerbaijan women's national volleyball team as an outside spiker.

== Career ==
Originally from Ukraine, Yelyzaveta moved to Baku, Azerbaijan in 2012, and began her professional career at Rabita Baku in 2014. During the 2016-17 season, she was the captain of Telekom Baku and won the championship in Azerbaijani Super League and became the MVP of the season. In summer of 2017, she transferred to the Italian Serie A1 team, Pallavolo Scandicci. In summer of 2018, she transferred to the Russian Superleague team, Leningradka Saint-Petersburg . She then spent a season at Bolu Belediyyespor, followed by 3 years in Romanian league, playing for CSM Lugoj and CSM Volei Alba Blaj. In 2025, Ruban returned to Leningradka.

== National team ==
Ruban made her debut for Azerbaijani senior team in 2015. She helped her team earn gold at the 2016 Women's European Volleyball League and 2017 Islamic Solidarity Games. She played in 4 editions of Women's European Volleyball Championship for Azerbaijan (2017, 2019, 2023, 2026), including the 2017 tournament where Azerbaijan reached the semifinals.

== Personal life ==
Ruban has been previously married to Jovan Krneta, a Serbian professional football player.

== Awards ==
=== Individual ===
- Azerbaijan Superleague (2016/2017): MVP (Most Valuable Player), Best Spiker, Best Server
- Azerbaijan Superleague (2015/2016): Best Spiker
- CEV Challenge Cup (2022/2023): Best Scorer
- Romanian Cup (2022/2023): MVP
- Romanian League (Divizia A1) (2022/2023): Best Outside Hitter
- Romanian League (Divizia A1) (2024/2025): Best Outside Hitter
- Romanian Cup (2024/2025): Best Scorer

=== Club ===
- Azerbaijan Superleague Champion: 2014/2015, 2016/2017 (with Rabita Baku)
- Italian Serie A1, 3rd place: 2017/2018 (with Savino Del Bene Scandicci)
- Romanian League Divizia A1 Champion: 2024/2025 (with CSM Volei Alba Blaj)
- Romanian Cup Winner: 2022/2023, 2024/2025 (with CSM Lugoj and Volei Alba Blaj)
- Romanian Supercup Winner: 2022/2023 (with CSM Lugoj)
- CEV Challenge Cup Runner Up: 2022/2023 (with CSM Lugoj)
