= Olena Kharchenko =

Ukrainian-born Azerbaijani volleyball player

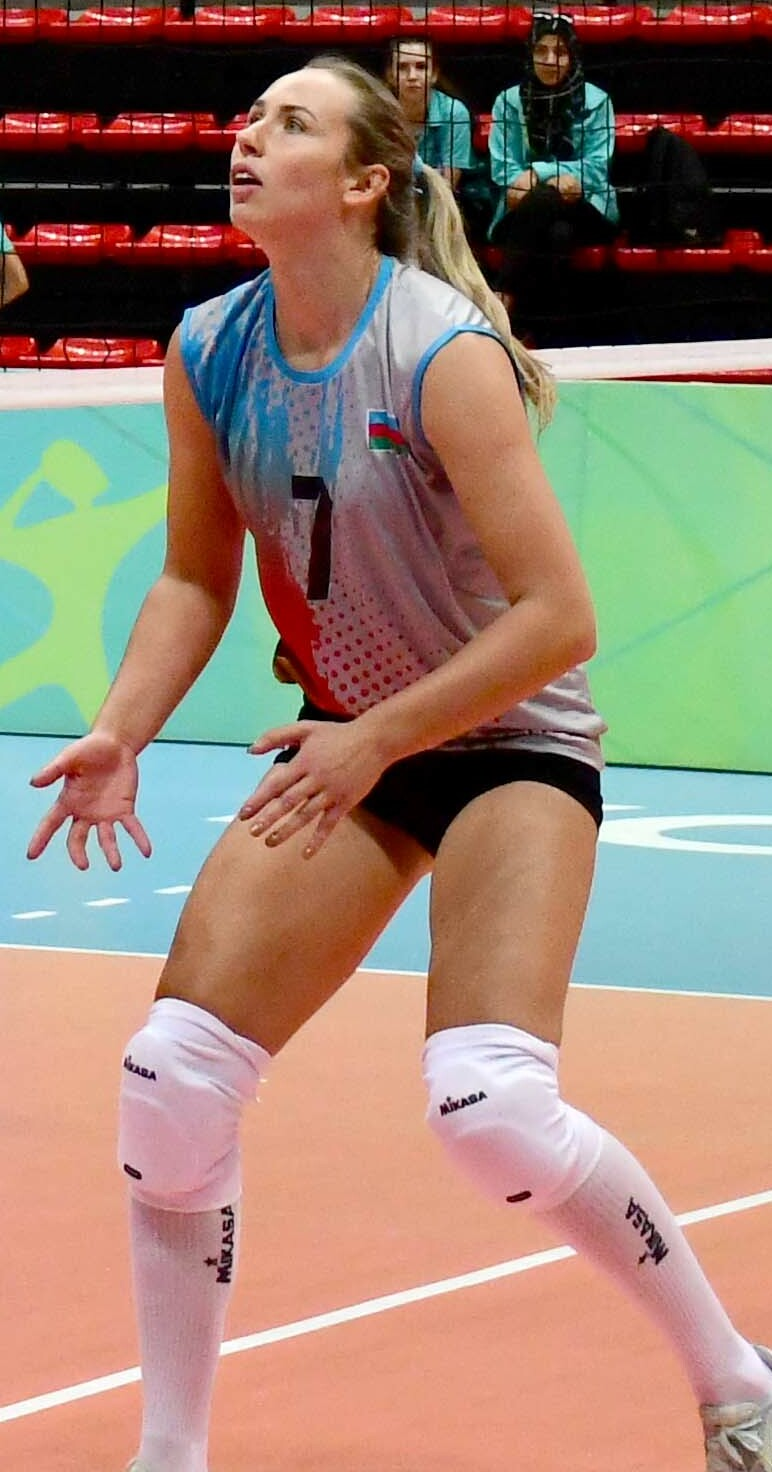

Personal information
- Nationality: Ukraine; Azerbaijan
- Born: 25 November 1995 (age 30); Ukraine
- Height: 1.88 m (6 ft 2 in)
- Weight: 72 kg (159 lb)
- Spike: 305 cm (120 in)
- Block: 285 cm (112 in)

Volleyball information
- Position: Middle-blocker
- Current club: Çukurova Belediyespor
- Number: 17

Career
| Years | Teams |
|---|---|
| 2014-2017; 2017-2018; 2018-2020; 2020-2021; 2021-2022; 2022-present | Telekom Baku; Le Cannet Volley Ball; Volero Le Cannet; 1. MCM-Diamant KNRC; Bolu Belediyyespor; Çukurova Belediyespor |

National team
| 2014-present | Azerbaijan |
Honours
Women's volleyball
Representing Azerbaijan
European League
| Gold medal – first place | 2016 Nitra | Team |
Islamic Solidarity Games
| Gold medal – first place | 2017 Baku | Team |
| Bronze medal – third place | 2021 Konya | Team |

Olena Kharchenko (Ukrainian: Олена Харченко; born 25 November 1995) is a Ukrainian-born Azerbaijani volleyball player who plays as middle-blocker for Çukurova Belediyespor in the Turkish Women's Volleyball League and the Azerbaijan national volleyball team.

== Sources ==
- "Две украинки приняли азербайджанское гражданство" (in Russian). 14 June 2014. Archived from the original on 21 September 2021.
