= Beytullah Hatipoğlu =

Turkish volleyball player (born 1992)

Personal information
- Full name: Beytullah Hatipoğlu
- Nickname: Beyto
- Born: 24 February 1992 (age 34); Bursa, Turkey
- Height: 1.95 m (6 ft 5 in)
- Weight: 85 kg (187 lb)
- Spike: 350 cm (138 in)
- Block: 330 cm (130 in)

Volleyball information
- Position: Libero

Career
Years
- 2010–2011
- 2011–2012
- 2012–2014
- 2014–2015
- 2015–2017
- 2017–2019
- 2019–2021
- 2021–2024
Teams
- Tofaş Bursa
- Bursa Emniyetspor
- İnegöl Belediyesi
- Tofaş Bursa
- İnegöl Belediyesi
- Afyon Belediye Yüntaş
- Istanbul BBSK
- Galatasaray

National team
Turkey
Honours
Men's volleyball
Representing Turkey
Islamic Solidarity Games
Bronze medal – third place	2021 Konya	Team

Beytullah Hatipoğlu (born 24 February 1992) is a Turkish volleyball player. He is part of the Turkey men's national volleyball team. At the club level, he plays for Galatasaray.

== Club career ==
On 25 May 2021, Galatasaray signed a 2-year contract with the successful libero Hatipoğlu.
