= Alla Hasanova =

Azerbaijani volleyball player (born 1970)

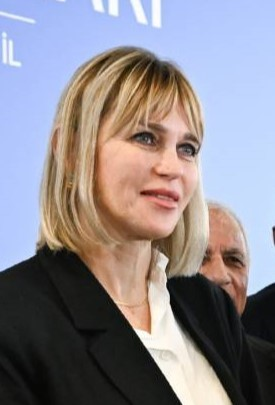

Personal information
- Nationality: Azerbaijani
- Born: 6 August 1970 (age 56)
- Height: 1.83 m (6 ft 0 in)

Volleyball information
- Number: 3 (national team)

Career
Years	Teams
1994	Emlak Bank Ankara

National team
1994	Azerbaijan

Alla Hasanova (born 6 August 1970) is an Azerbaijani former volleyball player who competed for the Women's National Team at the 1994 FIVB Volleyball Women's World Championship in Brazil. At the 2005 Women's European Volleyball Championship in Croatia she ended up in fourth place with the national squad, and was named Best Server of the tournament.

== Clubs ==
- Emlak Bank Ankara (1994)

== Individual awards ==
- 2005 European Championship "Best Server"
