= 2016 Women's European Volleyball League =

European volleyball tournament

- Dates: 3 June – 3 July
- Teams: 12

Final positions
- Champions: Azerbaijan (1st title)

Tournament awards
- MVP: (Azerbaijan) Polina Rahimova

The 2016 Women's European Volleyball League was the eighth edition of the annual tournament. It was held from 3 June to 3 July 2016. The tournament featured 12 teams.

Azerbaijan won their first title after defeating Slovakia in the final.

== Pool composition ==
Pool A	Pool B	Pool C
Albania	Azerbaijan	Greece
Belarus	France	Hungary
Poland	Montenegro	Romania
Slovakia	Spain	Slovenia

== League round ==
- All times are local

=== Pool A ===
Pos	Team	Pld	W	L	Pts	SW	SL	SR	SPW	SPL	SPR	Qualification
1	Slovakia	6	5	1	13	16	10	1.600	590	552	1.069	Final Four
2	Poland	6	3	3	10	14	13	1.077	599	614	0.976	
3	Belarus	6	2	4	8	13	15	0.867	614	597	1.028	
4	Albania	6	2	4	5	11	16	0.688	574	614	0.935	

==== 1st tournament ====
Venue: (Poland) Hala Sportowo - Widowiskowa, Twardogóra

Date	Time		Score		Set 1	Set 2	Set 3	Set 4	Set 5	Total	Report
3 Jun	17:00	Poland	3–1	Albania	21–25	25–16	27–25	27–25		100–91	Report
3 Jun	20:00	Belarus	1–3	Slovakia	19–25	26–24	22–25	24–26		91–100	Report
4 Jun	15:30	Albania	1–3	Slovakia	22–25	25–19	17–25	19–25		83–94	Report
4 Jun	18:30	Poland	3–2	Belarus	22–25	18–25	27–25	26–24	17–15	110–114	Report
5 Jun	15:30	Albania	2–3	Belarus	25–17	25–22	11–25	23–25	10–15	94–104	Report
5 Jun	18:30	Slovakia	3–2	Poland	25–22	25–18	24–26	19–25	15–8	108–99	Report

==== 2nd tournament ====
Venue: (Albania) Pallati Sportit Ramazan Njala, Durrës

Date	Time		Score		Set 1	Set 2	Set 3	Set 4	Set 5	Total	Report
17 Jun	15:00	Slovakia	3–2	Belarus	25–23	25–21	19–25	15–25	15–8	99–102	Report
17 Jun	18:00	Albania	3–2	Poland	23–25	25–21	31–29	18–25	15–13	112–113	Report
18 Jun	15:00	Belarus	3–1	Poland	25–23	25–22	22–25	25–18		97–88	Report
18 Jun	18:00	Slovakia	3–1	Albania	22–25	25–23	25–18	25–22		97–88	Report
19 Jun	15:00	Poland	3–1	Slovakia	25–21	26–24	13–25	25–22		89–92	Report
19 Jun	18:00	Belarus	2–3	Albania	25–22	22–25	25–17	25–27	9–15	106–106	Report

=== Pool B ===
Pos	Team	Pld	W	L	Pts	SW	SL	SR	SPW	SPL	SPR	Qualification
1	Azerbaijan	6	6	0	18	18	2	9.000	488	374	1.305	Final Four
2	Spain	6	2	4	6	10	14	0.714	477	540	0.883	
3	France	6	2	4	6	10	16	0.625	526	547	0.962	
4	Montenegro	6	2	4	6	8	14	0.571	457	487	0.938	

==== 1st tournament ====
Venue: (Montenegro) Topolica Sport Hall, Bar

Date	Time		Score		Set 1	Set 2	Set 3	Set 4	Set 5	Total	Report
3 Jun	17:00	Azerbaijan	3–0	France	25–9	25–23	26–24			76–56	Report
3 Jun	20:00	Montenegro	3–0	Spain	25–21	25–20	25–13			75–54	Report
4 Jun	17:00	France	2–3	Spain	24–26	22–25	25–14	25–16	12–15	108–96	Report
4 Jun	20:00	Azerbaijan	3–0	Montenegro	25–21	25–23	25–22			75–66	Report
5 Jun	17:00	Spain	1–3	Azerbaijan	16–25	25–23	17–25	16–25		74–98	Report
5 Jun	20:00	France	2–3	Montenegro	19–25	25–20	25–21	17–25	9–15	95–106	Report

==== 2nd tournament ====
Venue: (France) Salle Colette-Besson, Rennes

Date	Time		Score		Set 1	Set 2	Set 3	Set 4	Set 5	Total	Report
10 Jun	15:00	Montenegro	0–3	Azerbaijan	12–25	21–25	19–25			52–75	Report
10 Jun	18:00	France	3–2	Spain	25–23	18–25	22–25	25–17	15–11	105–101	Report
11 Jun	16:00	Azerbaijan	3–1	Spain	25–14	25–19	14–25	25–17		89–75	Report
11 Jun	19:00	Montenegro	2–3	France	25–20	13–25	28–26	21–25	6–15	93–111	Report
12 Jun	16:00	Spain	3–0	Montenegro	25–19	25–21	27–25			77–65	Report
12 Jun	19:00	Azerbaijan	3–0	France	25–13	25–23	25–15			75–51	Report

=== Pool C ===
Pos	Team	Pld	W	L	Pts	SW	SL	SR	SPW	SPL	SPR	Qualification
1	Slovenia	6	6	0	18	18	1	18.000	474	365	1.299	Final Four
2	Greece	6	4	2	12	12	7	1.714	428	394	1.086	Final Four
3	Romania	6	2	4	6	6	12	0.500	368	411	0.895	
4	Hungary	6	0	6	0	2	18	0.111	390	490	0.796	

==== 1st tournament ====
Venue: (Hungary) Bujtosi Szabadidő Csarnok, Nyíregyháza

Date	Time		Score		Set 1	Set 2	Set 3	Set 4	Set 5	Total	Report
3 Jun	16:00	Greece	3–0	Romania	25–21	25–15	25–19			75–55	Report
3 Jun	18:30	Hungary	0–3	Slovenia	21–25	17–25	24–26			62–76	Report
4 Jun	16:00	Romania	0–3	Slovenia	21–25	14–25	21–25			56–75	Report
4 Jun	18:30	Greece	3–1	Hungary	27–25	25–15	12–25	25–15		89–80	Report
5 Jun	17:30	Slovenia	3–0	Greece	25–21	25–18	25–18			75–57	Report
5 Jun	20:00	Romania	3–0	Hungary	27–25	25–22	25–16			77–63	Report

==== 2nd tournament ====
Venue: (Greece) Indoor Sports Hall, Megalopolis

Date	Time		Score		Set 1	Set 2	Set 3	Set 4	Set 5	Total	Report
9 Jun	17:30	Slovenia	3–1	Hungary	25–18	25–19	23–25	25–23		98–85	Report
9 Jun	20:30	Greece	3–0	Romania	25–17	25–20	25–20			75–57	Report
10 Jun	17:30	Hungary	0–3	Romania	17–25	16–25	15–25			48–75	Report
10 Jun	20:30	Slovenia	3–0	Greece	25–21	25–13	25–23			75–57	Report
11 Jun	18:00	Romania	0–3	Slovenia	17–25	18–25	13–25			48–75	Report
11 Jun	21:00	Hungary	0–3	Greece	14–25	17–25	21–25			52–75	Report

== Final four ==
The top team of each pool will qualify for the final four. Pre-qualified tournament host team will complete the group.

=== Bracket ===
- All times are local

Semifinal
A1	Slovakia	3	3	5
C1	Slovenia	2	1	1
B1	Azerbaijan	3	3	6
C2	Greece	1	1	0

Final
A1	Slovakia	1	0	0
B1	Azerbaijan	3	3	6

=== Semifinal ===
Leg 1

Date	Time		Score		Set 1	Set 2	Set 3	Set 4	Set 5	Total	Report
22 Jun	20:00	Slovenia	2–3	Slovakia	16–25	25–18	26–24	17–25	12–15	96–107	Report
25 Jun	18:00	Greece	1–3	Azerbaijan	23–25	21–25	25–23	19–25		88–98	Report

Leg 2

Date	Time		Score		Set 1	Set 2	Set 3	Set 4	Set 5	Total	Report
26 Jun	15:00	Slovakia	3–1	Slovenia	25–18	22–25	25–13	25–15		97–71	Report
26 Jun	18:00	Azerbaijan	3–1	Greece	25–22	9–25	25–15	25–16		84–78	Report

=== Final ===
Date	Time		Score		Set 1	Set 2	Set 3	Set 4	Set 5	Total	Report
30 Jun	18:00	Slovakia	1–3	Azerbaijan	19–25	25–18	22–25	20–25		86–93	Report
3 Jul	18:00	Azerbaijan	3–0	Slovakia	25–15	25–22	25–20			75–57	Report

== Final standings ==
Rank	Team
1st place, gold medalist(s)	Azerbaijan
2nd place, silver medalist(s)	Slovakia
3rd place, bronze medalist(s)	Slovenia
3rd place, bronze medalist(s)	Greece
5	Poland
6	Spain
7	Belarus
7	France
7	Romania
10	Albania
10	Montenegro
10	Hungary

2016 Women's European League winners

Azerbaijan

14–woman Roster
Aliyeva, Poznyak, Gurbanova, Bayramova, Pavlenko, Hasanova, Kulan, Zhidkova, Mammadova, Yagubova, Karimova, Kiselyova, Rahimova, Habibova
Head coach
Faig Garayev

== Awards ==
- MVP: (Azerbaijan) Polina Rahimova

== See also ==
- 2016 Men's European Volleyball League
