= Odina Aliyeva =

Azerbaijani volleyball player

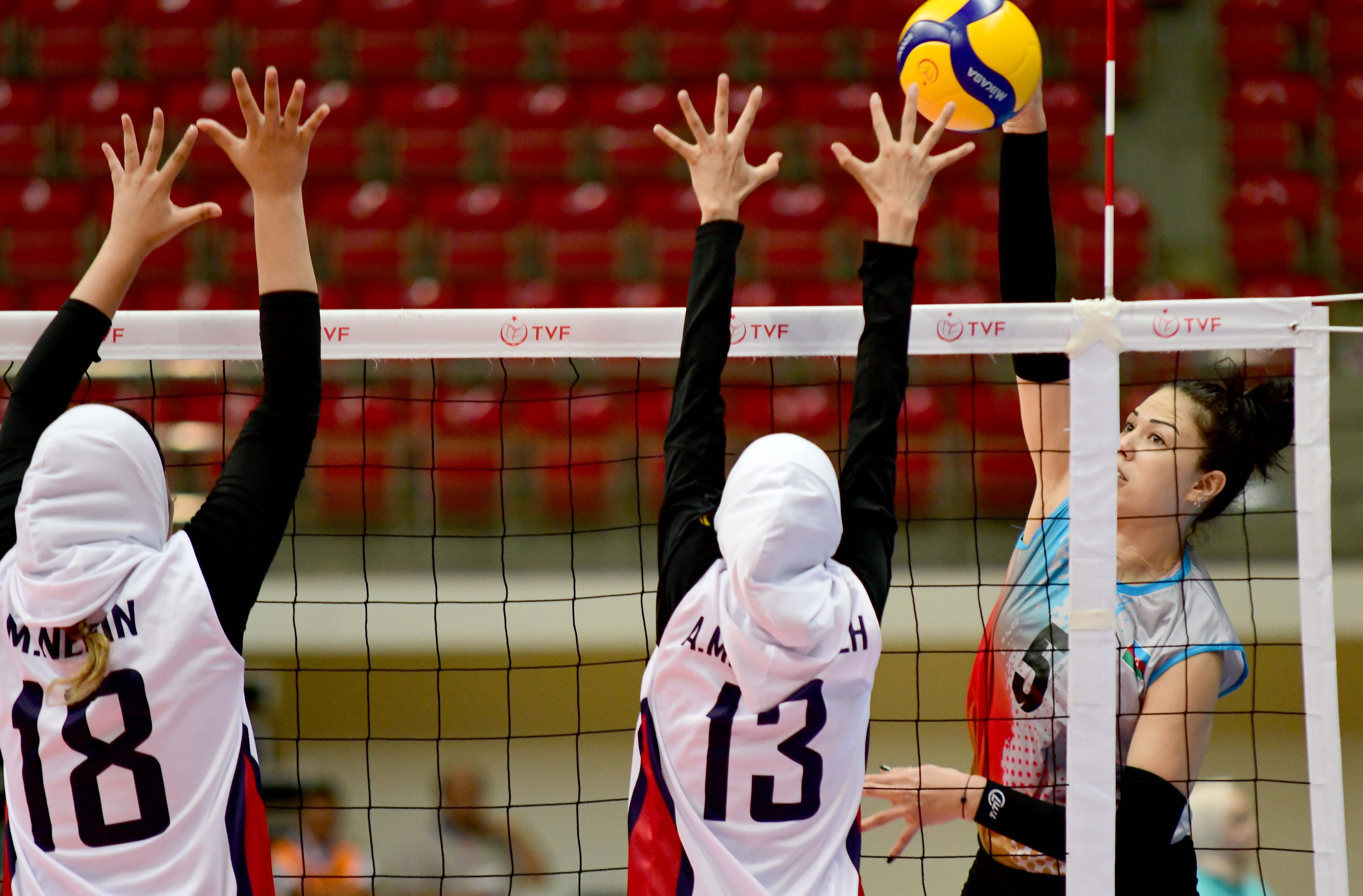

Personal information
- Nationality: Uzbekistani; Azerbaijani
- Born: 22 May 1990 (age 36); Navoiy, Uzbekistan
- Height: 1.86 m (6 ft 1 in)
- Weight: 83 kg (183 lb)
- Spike: 315 cm (124 in)
- Block: 295 cm (116 in)

Volleyball information
- Position: Outside-spiker
- Current club: Shenzhen Zhongsai
- Number: 5

National team
2011–present	Azerbaijan
Honours
Women's volleyball
Representing Azerbaijan
European League
Gold medal – first place	2016 Nitra	Team
Islamic Solidarity Games
Gold medal – first place	2017 Baku	Team
Bronze medal – third place	2021 Konya	Team

Odina Aliyeva (born 22 May 1990) is an Uzbekistani-born Azerbaijani volleyball player who plays for Shenzhen Zhongsai and the Azerbaijani national volleyball team.

== Personal life ==
Bayramova is married to Azerbaijani volleyball player Vugar Bayramov.
