= Pobisk Kuznetsov =

Soviet Scientist and Philosopher

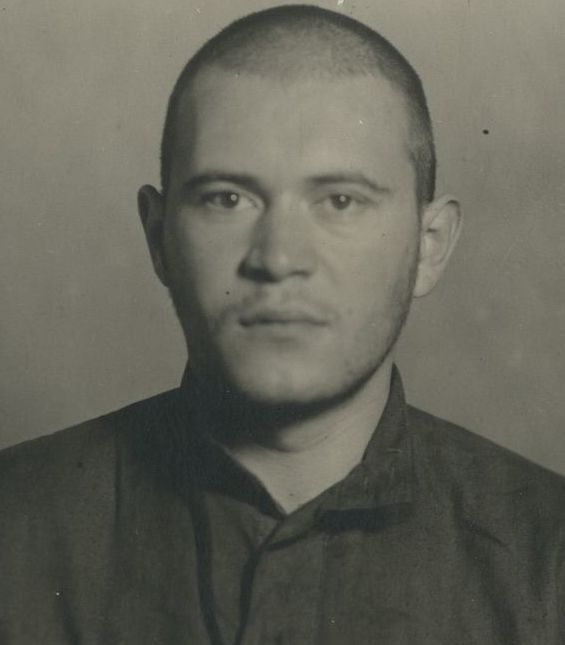
- Born: May 18, 1924; Krasnoyarsk
- Died: December 4, 2000
- Occupations: Polymath, thinker, scientist, philosopher, mathematician, design engineer, physicist, sociologist, chemist, engineer, economist, systems analyst
- Employers: Dubna State University; Moscow Institute of Physics and Technology

Pobisk Georgievich Kuznetsov (Russian: Побиск Георгиевич Кузнецов; May 18, 1924, in Krasnoyarsk – December 4, 2000) was a Soviet Russian philosopher and scientist (chemist). Doctor of Sciences, Professor. He was professor at the Moscow Institute of Physics and Technology and Dubna State University (Moscow region, Dubna city, Russia). He was the last general designer of the USSR. He worked for the State Duma of the Russian Federation.

His father was a retired military man and his mother was a Physics teacher. He went to school in Novosibirsk. He then studied in Leningrad. During the war he became a Junior lieutenant. He was awarded the Order of the Red Star on 1943. He was injured in 1943. He suffered from Stalin's repression. (He was arrested in 1944. He was released in 1954.) He was rehabilitated in 1956. He worked as a tractor driver. From 1955 to 1961 he worked in the Ministry of Geology.

In 1958 he graduated. From 1961 to 1964 he is a postgraduate student at the V. I. Lenin Moscow State Pedagogical Institute. He defended his dissertation for the Candidate of Sciences degree in 1965. He worked at the V. I. Lenin Moscow State Pedagogical Institute. He headed the laboratory there, which was created on the initiative of Alexander Shelepin. In 1970 he was arrested and placed in a psychiatric clinic (Serbsky Center). As he claimed, Shchelokov arrested him. The Academy of Sciences was outraged and he was released. He worked together with Robert Bartini. Since 1974 he worked at the Moscow Power Engineering Institute. Then he worked at Moscow Institute of Physics and Technology.

He was the author of 200 scientific papers. He published in the newspaper Pravda.

He was also awarded the Order of the Patriotic War in 1985, the Medal "For Distinguished Labour" in 1969.

== Ideas ==
Many of his ideas emerged in the 1940s. What mattered was that in 1947 he learned about biophotons. He developed the ideas of Russian cosmism.

Viktor Afanasyev and Ivan Yefremov supported him. Kuznetsov influenced Evald Ilyenkov, with whom he was close friends in the 1950s. Kuznetsov worked with Spartak Nikanorov (he met him in 1963, they will become friends).

Kuznetsov called himself a student of Nikanorov and Ilyenkov. Kuznetsov was influenced by Nicholas Georgescu-Roegen.

Lyndon LaRouche said that Kuznetsov was one of the first to understand the principles of physical economics.
