= Azerbaijan women's national volleyball team =

Women's national volleyball team representing Azerbaijan

Azerbaijan
- Association: AVF
- Confederation: CEV
- Head coach: Faig Garayev
- FIVB ranking: 48 (24 May 2026)

Uniforms
Home	Away	Third

World Championship
- Appearances: 4 (First in 1994)
- Best result: 9th (1994)

European Championship
- Appearances: 11 (First in 2005)
- Best result: 4th (2005, 2017)
- Federation Website
Honours
European League
Gold medal – first place	2016 Nitra / Baku	Team
Islamic Solidarity Games
Gold medal – first place	2017 Baku	Team
Silver medal – second place	2025 Riyadh	Team
Bronze medal – third place	2021 Konya	Team

The Azerbaijan women's national volleyball team (Azerbaijani: Azərbaycan qadın milli voleybol komandası) is governed by the Azerbaijan Volleyball Federation (AVF) and represents Azerbaijan in international CEV and FIVB tournaments.

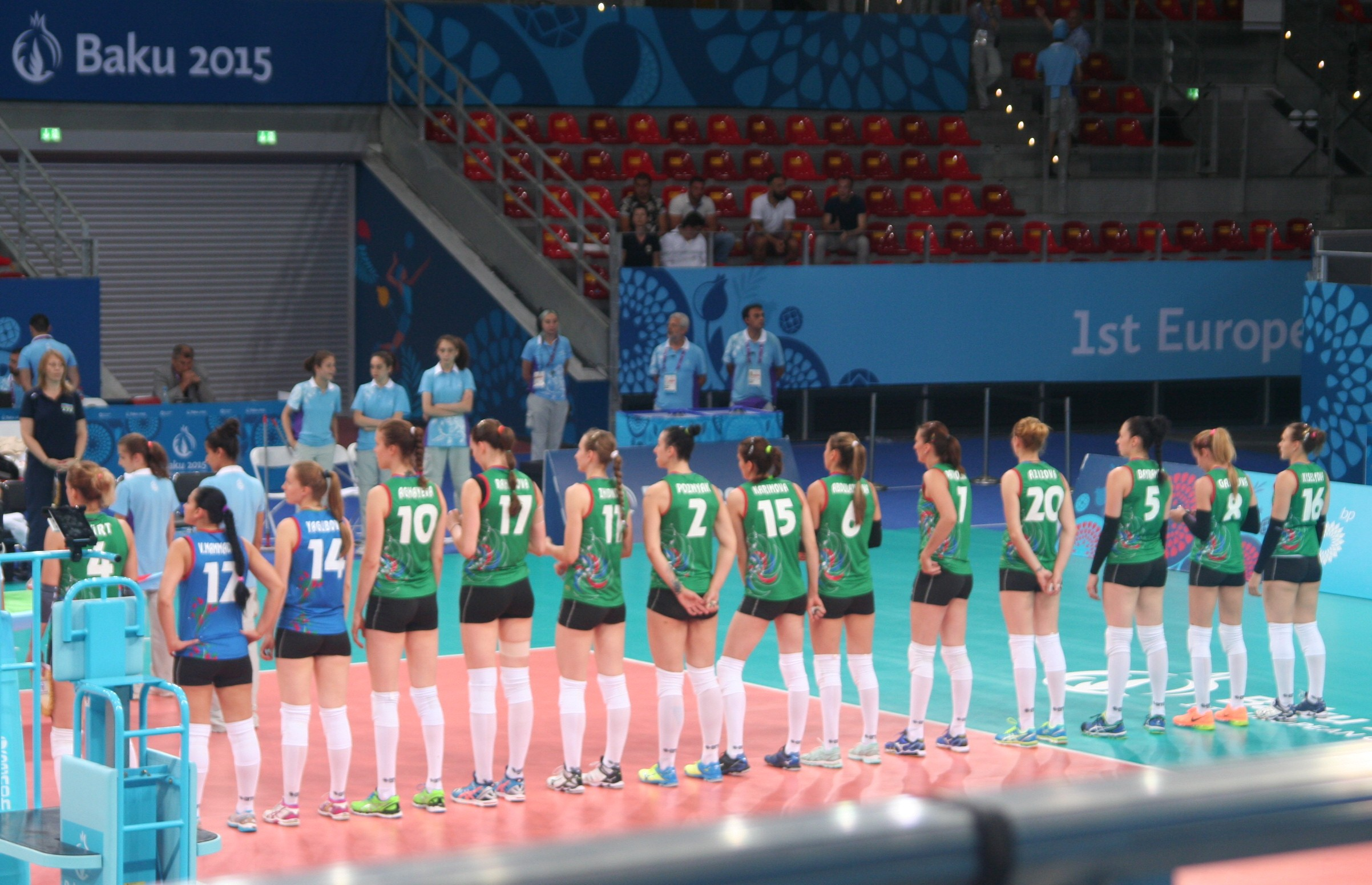
Azerbaijan women's national volleyball team at the 2015 European Games bronze final

== History ==
=== Origins and Early Independence (1990s) ===
Volleyball has deep historical roots in the region, having produced iconic players such as Olympic multi-medalist Inna Ryskal during the Soviet era. Following the restoration of national independence, the team made its debut on the global stage at the 1994 FIVB Volleyball Women's World Championship in Brazil, finishing in ninth place. Longtime head coach Faig Garayev played a foundational role during this era, establishing structural stability and a distinct tactical identity for the squad.

=== Rise to European Prominence (2000s–2010s) ===
Bolstered by the continental success of domestic club Azerrail Baku, the national side emerged as a major competitive force across Europe in the early 2000s. The team achieved a breakthrough at the 2005 Women's European Volleyball Championship in Croatia, finishing in fourth place. Powered by world-class attackers such as Natalya Mammadova and Polina Rahimova, Azerbaijan regularly qualified for prestigious events, including the 2006, 2014, and 2018 World Championships. In 2016, the squad captured its first major international trophy by winning the CEV Women's European Volleyball League title, followed by gold at 2017 Islamic Solidarity Games in Baku. Co-hosting the 2017 European Championship in Baku, Azerbaijan matched its best-ever continental finish by placing fourth in front of a home crowd.

=== Transitional Era and Regional Success (2020–present) ===
Following the peak of the 2017 campaign, the national team entered a rebuilding phase marked by squad turnover and the phasing out of its golden generation. Azerbaijan shifted its focus toward integrating younger talent while maintaining regular appearances in the CEV European Golden League and EuroVolley tournaments. The team has also enjoyed success in regional multi-sport competitions, capturing bronze medals at the 2021 Islamic Solidarity Games and silver medals at the 2025 edition. Today, women's volleyball remains one of the most decorated and historically prominent team sports in Azerbaijan's sporting history.

== Competitive record ==
Champions Runners-up Third place Fourth place

=== World Championship ===
World Championship record
Year	Round	Position	Pld	W	L	SW	SL	Squad
(Brazil) 1994	Group stage	9th	3	1	2	4	6	Squad
(Japan) 1998	Did not qualify							
(Germany) 2002	Did not qualify							
(Japan) 2006	Second round	13th	9	4	5	14	18	Squad
(Japan) 2010	Did not qualify							
(Italy) 2014	Second round	15th	9	4	5	14	19	Squad
(Japan) 2018	Second round	15th	9	2	7	8	22	Squad
(Netherlands) / (Poland) 2022	Did not qualify							
(Thailand) 2025	Did not qualify							
(Canada) / (United States) 2027	To be determined							
(Philippines) 2029	To be determined							
Total	0 titles	4/22	30	11	19	40	65	—

=== European Championship ===
European Championship record
Year	Round	Position	Pld	W	L	SW	SL	Squad
(Turkey) 2003	Did not qualify							
(Croatia) 2005	Semifinals	4th	7	4	3	12	11	Squad
(Belgium) / (Luxembourg) 2007	Playoff round	12th	8	1	7	4	21	Squad
(Poland) 2009	Playoff round	12th	8	1	7	8	23	Squad
(Italy) / (Serbia) 2011	Playoff round	9th	4	1	3	6	10	Squad
(Germany) / (Switzerland) 2013	Preliminary round	15th	3	0	3	1	9	Squad
(Netherlands) / (Belgium) 2015	Preliminary round	14th	3	0	3	1	9	Squad
(Azerbaijan) / (Georgia (country)) 2017	Semifinals	4th	6	4	2	15	7	Squad
(Slovakia) / (Hungary) / (Poland) / (Turkey) 2019	Round of 16	10th	6	4	2	12	10	Squad
(Serbia) / (Bulgaria) / (Croatia) / (Romania) 2021	Preliminary round	24th	5	0	5	1	15	Squad
(Belgium) / (Italy) / (Germany) / (Estonia) 2023	Preliminary round	17th	5	2	3	8	11	Squad
(Turkey) / (Czech Republic) / (Azerbaijan) / (Sweden) 2026	Round of 16	13th	6	3	3	10	12	Squad
(Spain) 2028	To be determined							
Total	0 titles	11/35	55	17	38	68	126	—

=== European League ===
European League record
Year	Round	Position	Pld	W	L	SW	SL	Squad
(Germany) 2014	League round	4th	12	5	7	21	25	Squad
(Hungary) / (Turkey) 2015	Did Not Participate							
(Azerbaijan) / (Slovakia) 2016	Final	1st	10	10	0	30	5	Squad
(Ukraine) / (Finland) 2017	Did Not Participate							
(Hungary) 2018	Golden league	5th	6	5	1	16	7	Squad
(Croatia) 2019	Golden league	10th	6	0	6	6	18	Squad
(Bulgaria) 2021	Golden league	11th	6	0	6	2	18	Squad
(France) 2022	Withdrew							
(Romania) / (Sweden) 2023	Did Not Participate							
(Czech Republic) 2024	Golden league	8th	6	2	4	9	12	Squad
(Sweden) 2025	Golden league	12th	6	0	6	2	18	Squad
(Europe) 2026	League round	12th	6	3	3	10	9	Squad
Total	1 titles	8/17	58	25	33	86	112	—

=== Islamic Solidarity Games ===
Islamic Solidarity Games record
Year	Round	Position	Pld	W	L	SW	SL
(Azerbaijan) 2017	Final	1st	5	5	0	15	1
(Turkey) 2021	Semifinal	3rd	5	4	1	13	4
(Saudi Arabia) 2025	Final	2nd	5	3	2	9	6
Total	1 title	1/3	15	12	3	37	11

=== European Games ===
European Games record
Year	Round	Position	Pld	W	L	SW	SL	Squad
(Azerbaijan) 2015	Semifinals	4th	8	5	3	19	13	Squad
Total	0 titles	1/1	8	5	3	19	13	—

== Current squad ==
The following is the roster for the 2026 Women's European Volleyball Championship.

Head coach: Faig Garayev

No.	Name	Date of birth	Club
1	Jeyran Imanova	3 January 1995	(Azerbaijan) DH Volley
3	Yelyzaveta Ruban	3 March 1995	(Russia) Leningradka
5	Raziya Aliyeva	29 August 2002	(Azerbaijan) DH Volley
6	Ayshan Abdulazimova (c)	11 April 1993	(Azerbaijan) Turan VC
7	Narmina Musayeva	24 October 1999	(Azerbaijan) Ganja VC
8	Ulkar Karimova	22 June 1994	(Azerbaijan) Turan VC
11	Aynur Imanova	7 December 1988	(Azerbaijan) DH Volley
14	Kristina Besman	13 February 1996	(Russia) VK Omichka
16	Yuliya Karimova	7 February 1988	(Azerbaijan) Turan VC
17	Polina Rahimova	5 June 1990	(Greece) Panionios V.C.
19	Bayaz Guluyeva	9 June 1990	(Azerbaijan) DH Volley
20	Margarita Stepanenko	25 April 1993	(Azerbaijan) UNEC VC
21	Kseniya Pavlenko	30 August 1993	(Azerbaijan) Milli Aviasiya Akademiyasi
22	Mariya Kirilyuk	16 February 1995	(Russia) VC Yenisey

== Records ==
=== Rankings ===
Azerbaijan achieved its highest ranking in the FIVB Senior World Rankings in 2018, when it was ranked #15 in the world. National team had its lowest ranking in June 2026, when it was ranked #50 in the world with 68.83 points.

=== Managers ===
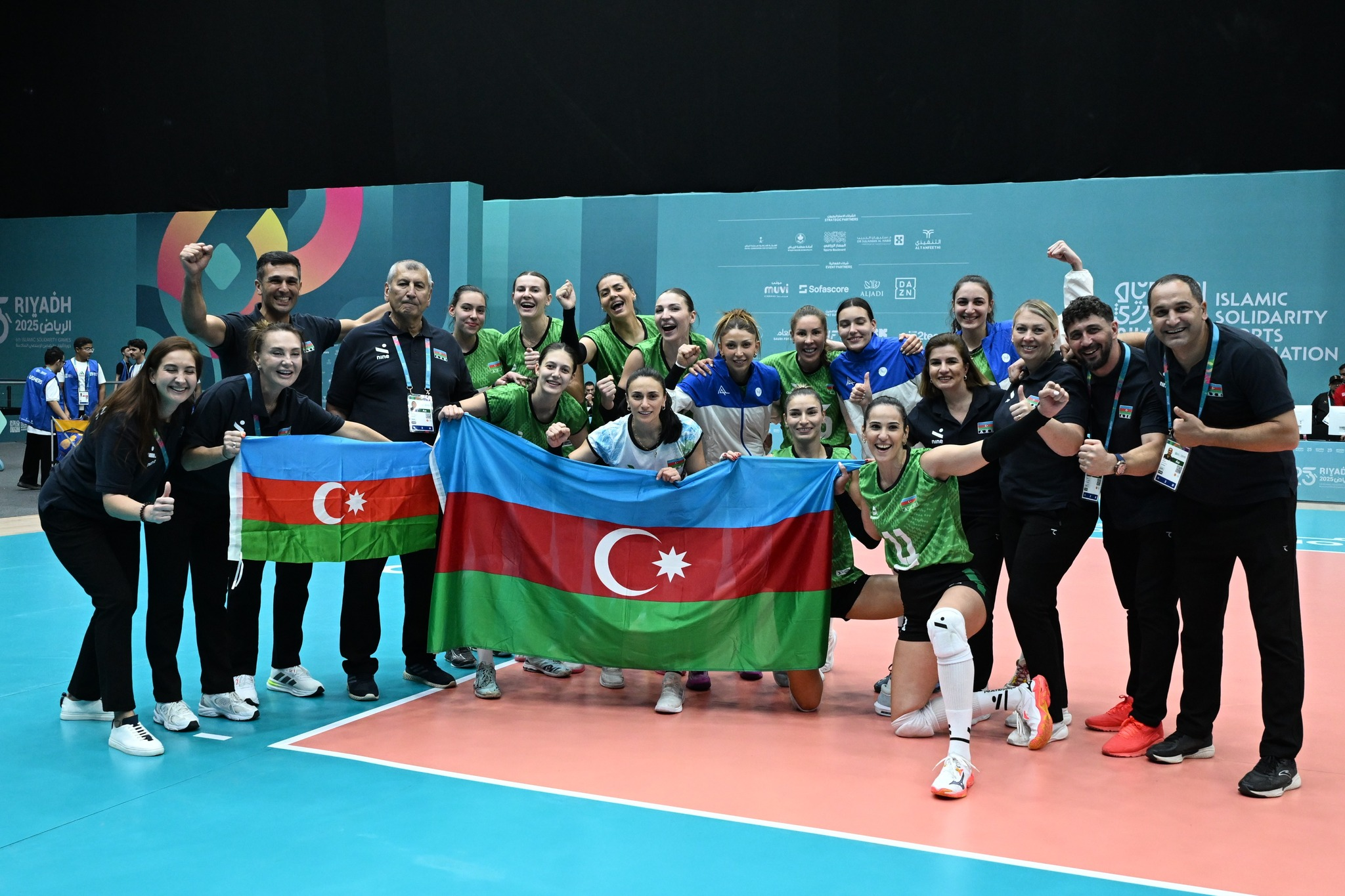
Azerbaijan women's national team in 2025

Azerbaijan Team Managers	From	To
(Azerbaijan) Faig Garayev	1992	2013
(Azerbaijan) Aleksandr Chervyakov	2013	2015
(Turkey) Bülent Karslioglu	2015	2015
(Azerbaijan) Faig Garayev	2016	2018
(Italy) Giovanni Caprara	2019	2019
(Azerbaijan) Vasif Talibov	2020	2020
(Azerbaijan) Vugar Aliyev	2021	2022
(Azerbaijan) Eldar Yusubov	2022	2022
(Turkey) Ataman Güneyligil	2023	2023
(Azerbaijan) Faig Garayev	2023	Present

=== Captains ===
Azerbaijan Team Captains	From	To
Alla Hasanova	1992	2005
Oksana Kurt	2006	2010
Natalya Mammadova	2010	2011
Oksana Kurt	2011	2015
Odina Bayramova	2016	2019
Ayshan Abdulazimova	2020	present

=== Notable former players ===
- Alla Hasanova (1992-2005)
- Yelena Shabovta (1994-2006)
- Oksana Kurt (1998-2015)
- Valeriya Mammadova (2002-2017)
- Yelena Parkhomenko (2003-2016)
- Inessa Korkmaz (2004-2009)
- Oksana Mammadyarova (2004-2011)
- Kseniya Poznyak (2004-2017)
- Natalya Mammadova (2004-2018)
- Aynur Imanova (2006-2026)
- Polina Rahimova (2007-2026)
- Odina Bayramova (2014-2023)
