= Margarita Stepanenko =

Ukrainian-born Azerbaijani volleyball player

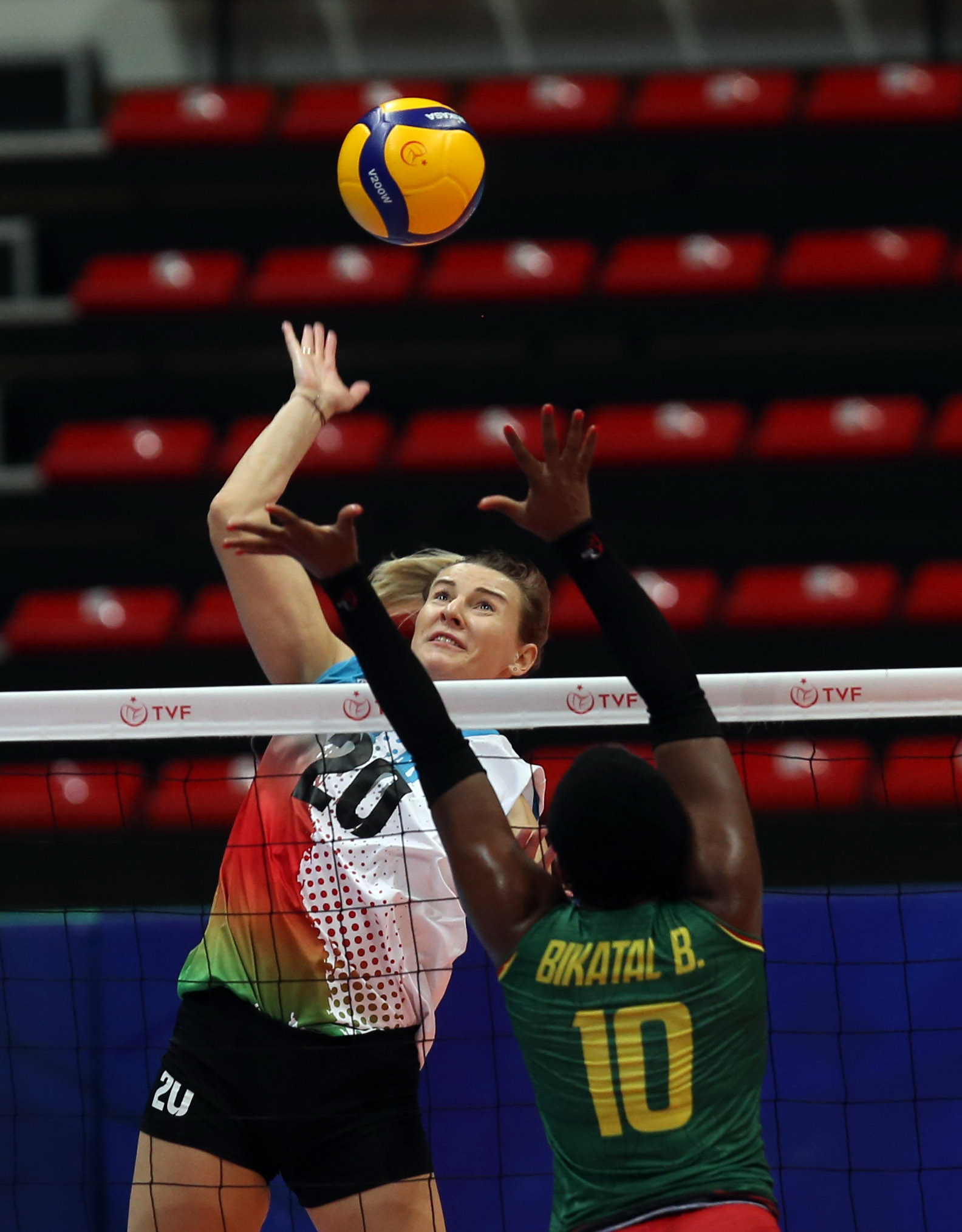

Personal information
- Nationality: Azerbaijan
- Born: 25 April 1993 (age 33) Luhansk, Ukraine
- Height: 1.86 m (6 ft 1 in)
- Weight: 73 kg (161 lb)
- Spike: 315 cm (124 in)
- Block: 300 cm (118 in)

Volleyball information
- Position: Opposite
- Current club: SC Prometey

Career
- Years: Team
- 2012-2017 2017-2018 2018-2019 2019-2020 2020-2021 2021-2022 2022-present: (Azerbaijan) Telekom Baku (Turkey) Beşiktaş (Poland) PTPS Piła (Poland) Radomka Radom (Belarus) Minchanka Minsk (Greece) Panathinaikos (Azerbaijan) Azerrail Baku

National team
- Years: Team
- 2015-present: Azerbaijan
Honours
Women's volleyball
Representing Azerbaijan
Islamic Solidarity Games
Bronze medal – third place	2021 Konya	Team
- Updated on 16 August 2022

Margarita Stepanenko (previously Azizova, born 25 April 1993) is a Ukrainian-born Azerbaijani volleyball player who plays as opposite for Azerrail Baku. She is a member of Azerbaijan national team and was part of the squad at the 2015, 2019 and 2021 editions of the European Championship.

== Clubs ==
- (Azerbaijan) Telekom Baku (2012-2017)
- (Turkey) Beşiktaş (2017-2018)
- (Poland) PTPS Piła (2018-2019)
- (Poland) Radomka Radom (2019-2020)
- (Belarus) Minchanka Minsk (2020-2021)
- (Greece) Panathinaikos (2021-2022)
- (Azerbaijan) Azerrail Baku (2022–present)
