= Kirillovsky (rural locality) =

Name of several Russian rural localities

Kirillovsky (Russian: Кири́лловский; masculine), Kirillovskaya (Кири́лловская; feminine), or Kirillovskoye (Кири́лловское; neuter) is the name of several rural localities in Russia:

- Kirillovskoye, Leningrad Oblast, a logging depot settlement in Krasnoselskoye Settlement Municipal Formation of Vyborgsky District of Leningrad Oblast
- Kirillovskoye, Mikhaylovsky Rural Okrug, Rybinsky District, Yaroslavl Oblast, a village in Mikhaylovsky Rural Okrug of Rybinsky District of Yaroslavl Oblast
- Kirillovskoye, Volzhsky Rural Okrug, Rybinsky District, Yaroslavl Oblast, a village in Volzhsky Rural Okrug of Rybinsky District of Yaroslavl Oblast
- Kirillovskoye, Tutayevsky District, Yaroslavl Oblast, a village in Chebakovsky Rural Okrug of Tutayevsky District of Yaroslavl Oblast
- Kirillovskaya, Arkhangelsk Oblast, a village in Fedorogorsky Selsoviet of Shenkursky District of Arkhangelsk Oblast
- Kirillovskaya, Irkutsk Oblast, a village in Nukutsky District of Irkutsk Oblast
