= Kirilenko =

Kirilenko (Russian: Кириле́нко) is a Russian surname of Ukrainian descent derived from the name of Cyril. Notable people with this name include:

- Andrei Kirilenko (born 1981), Russian basketball player who played in the National Basketball Association
- Andrei Kirilenko (politician) (1906–1990), Soviet politician
- Artur Kirilenko (born 1972), Russian and European real estate developer
- Denis Kirilenko (born 1984), Russian footballer
- Ivana Kirilenko (born 2000), Croatian footballer
- Maria Kirilenko (born 1987), Russian tennis player

== See also ==
- Kyrylenko
