= Kyrylenko =

Kyrylenko (Ukrainian: Кириле́нко) is a Ukrainian surname derived from the name of Kyrylo (Cyril). Notable people with this name include:

- Ihor Kyrylenko (born 1981), Ukrainian musician, songwriter, producer
- Ivan Kyrylenko (born 1956), Ukrainian politician and faction leader of Bloc Yulia Tymoshenko
- Kateryna Kyrylenko (born 1971), Ukrainian teacher of philosophy
- Pavlo Kyrylenko (born 1986), Ukrainian prosecutor and politician
- Vitaliy Kyrylenko (born 1968), Ukrainian long jumper
- Vyacheslav Kyrylenko (born 1968), Ukrainian politician

== See also ==
- Kirilenko
