= Kirill Tomashevich =

Russian politician (1852–1909)

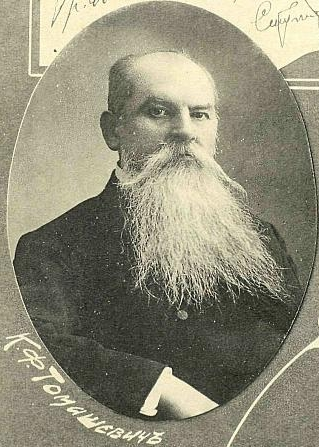
Kirill Tomashevich

Kirill Fomich Tomashevich (Russian: Кири́лл Фоми́ч Томаше́вич, (1853 – after 1909) was a deputy of State Duma of the Russian Empire of the III and the IV convocations from the Mogilev Governorate. He was included in the faction of nationalists.
