= Kiryukhin =

Kiryukhin (Russian: Кирюхин) may refer to:

- Andrei Kiryukhin (1987–2011), Russian ice-hockey player
- Nikolay Kiryukhin (1896–1953), Soviet general
- Oleg Kiryukhin (born 1975), Ukrainian boxer
- Oleksandr Kyryukhin (born 1974), Ukrainian footballer
