= Kirill Kononenko =

Russian ice hockey forward

- Born: September 1, 1992 (age 33) Prokopyevsk, Russia
- Height: 5 ft 10 in (178 cm)
- Weight: 185 lb (84 kg; 13 st 3 lb)
- Position: Forward
- Shot: Left
- Played for: HC Sibir Novosibirsk; Nomad Astana
- Playing career: 2012–2017

Kirill Kononenko (born September 1, 1992) is a Russian former professional ice hockey forward.

== Career ==
Kononenko played one regular season game and one playoff game for HC Sibir Novosibirsk of the Kontinental Hockey League during the 2012–13 KHL season. He also played in the Supreme Hockey League for HC Ryazan and Yermak Angarsk, the Kazakhstan Hockey Championship for Nomad Astana and the Czech 2.liga for SHK Hodonín.
