= Kirill Seleznyov (footballer) =

Russian footballer (born 1985)

Personal information
- Full name: Kirill Igorevich Seleznyov
- Date of birth: 8 December 1985 (age 40)
- Height: 1.83 m (6 ft 0 in)
- Position: Forward

Senior career*
Years	Team	Apps	(Gls)
2002–2004	FC Energiya Ulyanovsk		
2005–2006	FC Stroyplastmass Poldomasovo		
2007–2010	FC Volga Ulyanovsk	42	(1)
2011–2012	FC Volga-DYuSSh Ulyanovsk		
2014	FC PSK Ulyanovsk		
- * Club domestic league appearances and goals

Kirill Igorevich Seleznyov (Russian: Кирилл Игоревич Селезнёв; born 8 December 1985) is a former Russian professional football player.

== Club career ==
He played in the Russian Football National League for FC Volga Ulyanovsk until 2010.
