= Kirill Kravchenko =

Russian businessman

Kirill Albertovich Kravchenko
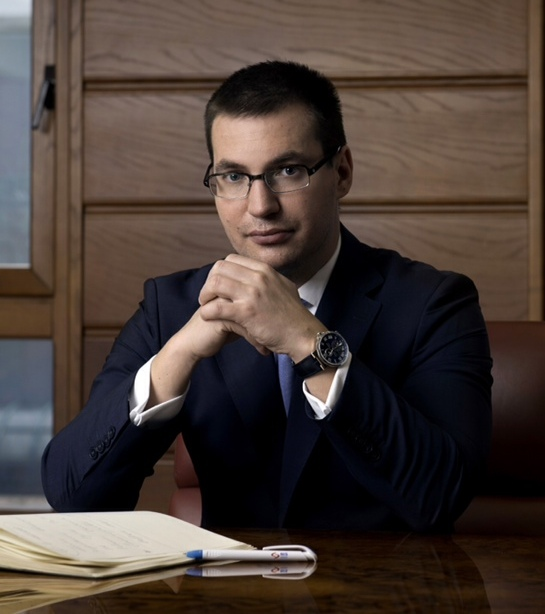
- Born: 13 May 1976 (age 50); Moscow, Soviet Union
- Education: Lomonosov Moscow State University

Kravchenko, Kirill Albertovich (born 13 May 1976 in Moscow) is Deputy Director General in charge of Administrative Affairs Gazprom Neft. Within Gazprom Neft is responsible to managing the organizational issues block, and for implementing several start-up projects of the company, for Operational Management System (OMS Etalon) and company safety. He is in charge of the introduction of "Digitization", a process that is implemented at the level of "Gazprom" group.

== Education ==
- 1993-1998 Lomonosov Moscow State University (Sociology)
- 1998-2001 Lomonosov Moscow State University (PhD in Sociology)
- 2002-2003 The Open University (UK) (Financial Management)
- 2003-2004 IMD Business School (Management)
- 2004-2006 Mendeleev D.I. Russian University of Chemical Technology (PhD in Economics)

== Career ==
- Until 2000-work in consulting sphere
- 2000-2004-YUKOS in various positions in Moscow and Western Siberia
- 2001-2002-work in Europe and Latin America in the company Schlumberger (partnership program with the oil company YUKOS)
- 2004-2007-Administrative Director of JSC MKHK EuroChim, Chairman of the Board of Directors of the "Lifosa" company
- In April 2007-appointed Deputy CEO, Foreign Asset Management of Gazprom Neft
- From February 2009-Deputy Director General of Gazprom Neft on Foreign Asset Management
- 2009-2017-General director of Oil Industry of Serbia Oil industry of Serbia (NIS)
- 2009-2018-Member of the Board of Directors of Oil Industry of Serbia Oil industry of Serbia (NIS)
- From July 2017-Deputy General Director of Gazprom neft for Administrative Affairs
- From 2017-President of Board of Directors of OOO ITSK

== Awards ==
- Golden medal of the Republic of Serbia for merits in strengthening cultural and economic ties between Serbia and Russia 2017
- St. Sava medal, the highest merit of the Serbian Orthodox Church for the contribution to the development of Russian-Serbian relations and the preservation of tradition and culture 2017
- National Business Award "Captains of Russian Business" 2010 in the "CEO" nomination
- Award Corporate Men of the Year by the magazine "The Men" for socially responsible business operation in 2010, most influent investment in 2011, most influent strateg in 2012
- Award Kapetan Miša Anastasijević for strategic management in 2011 and 2012
- Commendation Honorary Citizen of Pančevo given for special contribution to the town of Pančevo
- Award "Cooperation and extraordinary contribution" - Security - informative agency of Republic of Serbia
- The most influent foreigner in Serbia in 2009, 2010, 2011, 2012, 2013, 2014, 2015 by expert jury of Serbian edition of daily papers of Ringier Axel Springer.

== Additional Information ==
- Professor of Mendeleev D.I. Russian University of Chemical Technology, Gubkin Russian State University of Oil and Gas, University of Novi Sad (Serbia), Teaches at INSEAD - International business school and IEDC school at Bled in Slovenia, more than 100 books and scientific publications. He is a member of Association of independent directors in Russian Federation

Over the years, Kirill Kravchenko was elected to the board of directors of major Russian and foreign companies (USC Slavneft, JSC Tomskneft, Lifosa company, ITSC Construction Company, and EmAlliance)

== Bibliography ==
- Organizational Design and Development Management of Major Companies. K.A.Kravchenko, V.P. Meshalkin-M: Akademichesky proekt, 2006 - p. 531
- Organizational Construction and Personnel Management of a Major Company - M: Akademichesky proekt, 2005.-p. 636
- Guidance on Corporat Governance for Chairmen and Directors. Ed.A.A.Filatov, K.A.Kravchenko-M:Alpina Business Book, 2006.-p. 431
- Modern Practice of Corporate Governance in Russian Companies. Ed. A.A.Filatov, K.A. Kravchenko-M:Alpina Business Book, 2007.-p. 244
- Corporate Governance and Work of Board of Directors in Russian Companies. Ed. A.A. Filatov, K.A. Kravchenko-M: Alpina Business Book, 2007.-p. 244
- Major Company Management. K.A. Kravchenko, V.P. Meshalkin-M: Akademichesky proekt, 2010.-p. 351
- CEO School-Insights from 20 Global Business Leaders. S.V.Shekshnya, K.A.Kravchenko, E.Williams: , Palgrave Pivot , 2018
