= Yuliya Karimova =

Russian-born Azerbaijani volleyball player (born 1988)

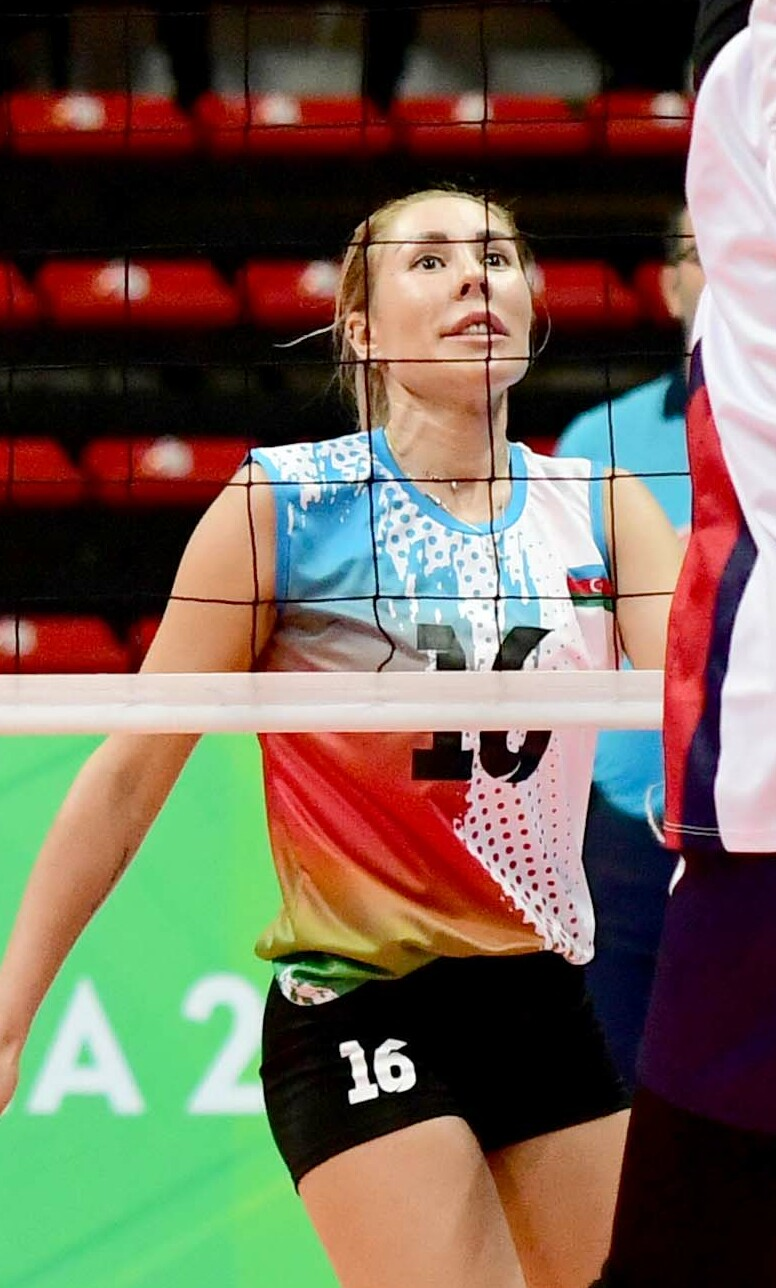

Personal information
- Nationality: Azerbaijan
- Born: 7 February 1988 (age 38) Kemerovo, Russian SFSR, Soviet Union
- Home town: Baku, Azerbaijan
- Height: 1.75 m (5 ft 9 in)
- Weight: 68 kg (150 lb)
- Spike: 280 cm (110 in)
- Block: 270 cm (110 in)

Volleyball information
- Position: Libero
- Current club: Azerrail Baku

Career
- Years: Team
- 2014–2015 2015–2017 2017–2018 2018–2019 2019–2020 2020-present: (Azerbaijan) Azerrail Baku (Azerbaijan) Azeryol Baku (Azerbaijan) Absheron VC (Kazakhstan) Almaty VC (Israel) Maccabi Haifa (Azerbaijan) Azerrail Baku

National team
- Years: Team
- 2018-present: Azerbaijan
Honours
Women's volleyball
Representing Azerbaijan
Islamic Solidarity Games
Bronze medal – third place	2021 Konya	Team
- Updated on 16 August 2022

Yuliya Karimova (Russian: Юлия Каримова; born 7 February 1988 in Kemerovo, Russia) is a Russian-born Azerbaijani volleyball player that plays for Azerrail Baku and Azerbaijan women's national volleyball team as a libero.

== Clubs ==
- (Azerbaijan) Azerrail Baku (2014-2015)
- (Azerbaijan) Azeryol Baku (2015-2017)
- (Azerbaijan) Absheron VC (2017-2018)
- (Kazakhstan) Almaty VC (2018-2019)
- (Israel) Maccabi Haifa (2019-2020)
- (Azerbaijan) Azerrail Baku (2020–present)
