= Kirillov (surname) =

Kirillov (Russian: Кири́ллов, masculine) or Kirillova (Кири́ллова; feminine) is a Russian surname that is derived from the masculine given names Kir or Kirill. It is shared by the following notable people:

- Alexandre Kirillov (born 1936), Russian mathematician
- Alexander Kirillov, Jr., his son, Russian-American mathematician
- Anastasia Kirillova (born 1996), Belarusian cross-country skier
- Boris Kirillov (born 1992), Azerbaijani swimmer
- Dayana Kirillova (born 2002), Russian singer
- Dmitri Kirillov (born 1998), Russian football player
- Dmitry Kirillov (curler) (born 1968), Belarusian curler and curling coach
- Ekaterina Kirillova (born 1973), Belarusian curler
- Elena Kirillova (born 1986), Russian basketball player
- Evgeny Kirillov (born 1987), Russian tennis player
- Faina Kirillova (1931–2024), Belarusian mathematician
- Igor Kirillov (1932–2021), Soviet and Russian television presenter and announcer
- Igor Kirillov (general) (1970–2024), Russian lieutenant general
- Irina Kirillova (born 1965), Soviet Olympic volleyball player
- Pyotr Kirillov (1910–1955), Mordvin Soviet writer
- Sergei Kirillov (born 1960), Russian artist
- Vadim Kirillov (born 1964), Soviet football player and coach
- Vladimir Kirillov (1889–1943), Russian/Soviet poet
- Vyacheslav Kirillov (born 1989), Russian football player
- Yelpidifor Kirillov (1883–1964), Soviet physicist
- Yuri Kirillov (born 1990), Russian football player

== In fiction ==
- Alexei Nilych Kirillov, hero of Demons (Dostoyevsky novel).

== See also ==
- Kirilov
- Kirillovsky (disambiguation)
