= Faig Garayev =

Azerbaijani volleyball player and coach

Faik Garayev
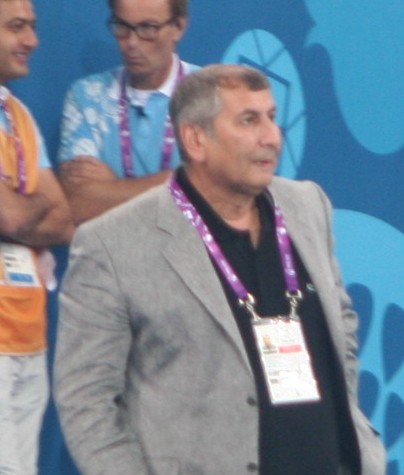

Personal information
- Born: 15 October 1959 (age 67); Ağstafa, Aşağı Kesemen, Azerbaijan, Azerbaijan SSR
- Hometown: Baku Azerbaijan

Coaching information
- Current team: Azerbaijan
Previous teams coached
| Years | Teams |
|---|---|
| 2001–2008; 1994–2000 | Azerrail Baku; Azerbaijan |

Faig Garayev (born 15 October 1959 Agstafa) is an Azerbaijani volleyball coach and former volleyball player.

== Managerial career ==
Garayev was born in 1959 to a middle-class family in Aghstafa.

== Honours ==
=== Manager ===
==== Azerrail Baku ====
- CEV Women's Challenge Cup
  - Winner: 2010/2011
- Women's CEV Top Teams Cup:
  - Winner: 2001/2002
  - Third place : 1992/1993

=== Individual ===
  - Shohrat Order: 2007
