= Spartak Nikanorov =

Soviet scientist (1923–2015)

Spartak Petrovich Nikanorov (Russian: Спартак Петрович Никаноров; 1923, in Moscow – 2015) was a Soviet and Russian management scientist, specialist in the field of information systems, systems analysis, systems theory, mathematician and engineer-inventor. He has worked in the field of creating an air-defense systems. Since 1987 professor at the MIREA. In 1991, he became a professor at the MFTI.

== Career ==
He graduated from the Faculty of Physics at Lomonosov Moscow State University in 1950. He also completed postgraduate studies at the NPO Almaz in 1960. From 1951 to 1967, he was a senior engineer and chief designer (Minradioprom). From 1967 to 1970, he was a chief specialist of the Moscow State Pedagogical University. From 1971 to 1975, he was a chief specialist of the Minenergo. From 1975 to 1987, he was a head of laboratory and department of the Gosstroy.

He was a deputy to Aksel Berg. Nikanorov also worked with Pobisk Kuznetsov.

Spartak Nikanorov participated in the creation of the S-25 Berkut and S-75 Dvina.

Maxim Kalashnikov highly rated him.

== Recognition ==
- Medal "For Valiant Labour in the Great Patriotic War 1941–1945"
- Medal "For the Victory over Germany in the Great Patriotic War 1941–1945"
- Order of the Badge of Honour
- Honorary fellow of the Russian Academy of Natural Sciences (2007)
