= Vugar Aliyev =

Azerbaijani volleyball coach

Personal information
- Born: 19 January 1974 (age 52) Baku, Azerbaijan SSR

Coaching information
- Current team: Murov VC
- Previous teams coached
- Years: Teams
- 2007–2010 2007–2010 2010-2011 2011-2014 2014-2015 2014-2016 2017 2017-2018 2021: Azerrail Baku (assistant); Azerbaijan (assistant); Azerrail Baku; Azeryol Baku; Azerrail Baku; Azerbaijan U-20; Azerbaijan U-18; Lokomotiv Baku; Azerbaijan

Vugar Aliyev (born 19 January 1974) is an Azerbaijani volleyball coach who currently manages Murov VC in Azerbaijan Women's Volleyball Super League.

He was the head coach of Azerbaijan national team at the 2021 Women's European Volleyball Championship. His removal followed a poor performance at that event.

At one point he was a coach for Oksana Kurt (nee Parkhomenko).
