= Kristina Besman =

Belarusian-born Azerbaijani volleyball player (born 1996)

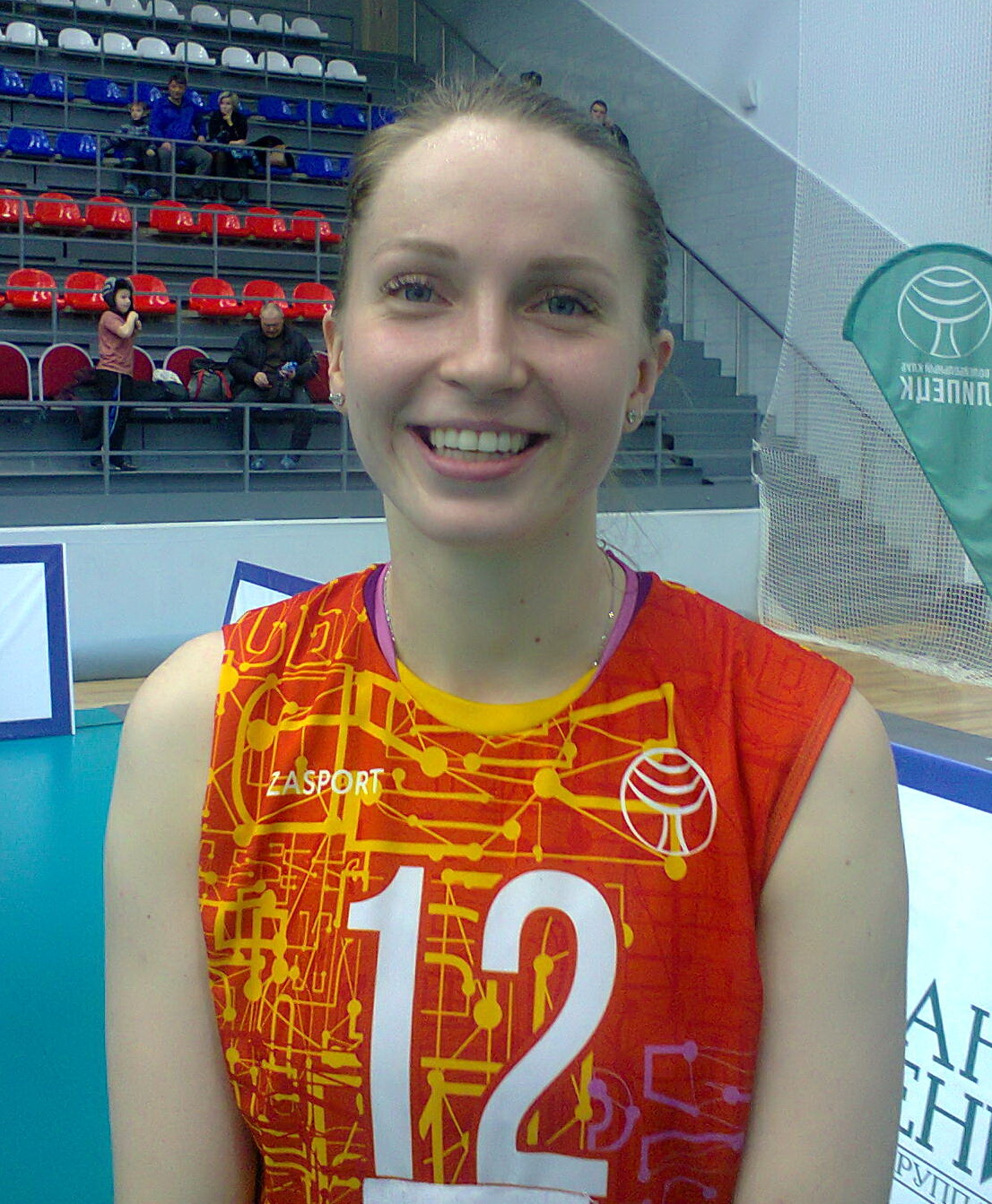

Personal information
- Nationality: Belarusian; Azerbaijani
- Born: 13 February 1996 (age 30); Belarus
- Height: 1.85 m (6 ft 1 in)
- Weight: 72 kg (159 lb)
- Spike: 295 cm (116 in)
- Block: 285 cm (112 in)

Volleyball information
- Position: Setter
- Current club: Tulitsa Tula

Career
| Years | Teams |
|---|---|
| 2013–2016; 2016–2017; 2017–2018; 2018–2019; 2019–2021; 2021-present | (Azerbaijan) Telekom Baku (Azerbaijan) Azeryol Baku (Azerbaijan) Azerrail Baku (Finland) LP Viesti Salo (Russia) Indesit Lipetsk (Russia) Tulitsa Tula |

National team
| 2015 - present | Azerbaijan |
Honours
Women's volleyball
Representing Azerbaijan
European League
| Gold medal – first place | 2016 Nitra | Team |
Islamic Solidarity Games
| Gold medal – first place | 2017 Baku | Team |
| Bronze medal – third place | 2021 Konya | Team |
- Last updated: 16 August 2022

Kristina Besman (Belarusian: Крысціна Бесман; Azerbaijani: Kristina Besman; born 13 February 1996) is a Belarusian-born Azerbaijani volleyball player for Tulitsa Tula and the Azerbaijani national team.

She participated at the 2017 Women's European Volleyball Championship.
