= Kirilov =

Kirilov (masculine) or Kirilova (feminine) is a Slavic surname shared by the following people:

- Andrey Kirilov (born 1967), Russian cross country skier
- Dimitri Kirilov (born 1978), Russian professional boxer
- Evgeni Kirilov (born 1945), Bulgarian politician
- Ivan Kirilov (botanist) (1821–1842), Russian botanist
- Ivan Kirilov (geographer) (1689–1737), Russian geographer and cartographer
- Rosen Kirilov (born 1973), Bulgarian football player

== See also ==
- Kirillov (surname)
- Chirilov
