= Kirill Nikonorov =

Russian ice hockey player

- Born: January 8, 1990 (age 36) Kuybyshev, Soviet Union
- Height: 5 ft 9 in (175 cm)
- Weight: 147 lb (67 kg; 10 st 7 lb)
- Position: Forward
- Shoots: Left
- KHL team: Lada Togliatti
- Playing career: 2007–present

Kirill Nikonorov (born January 8, 1990) is a Russian professional ice hockey player. He is currently playing with Lada Togliatti in the Kontinental Hockey League.
