= Mariya Kirilyuk =

Azerbaijani volleyball player (born 1995)

Personal information
- Nationality: Azerbaijani
- Born: 16 February 1995 (age 31); Svetlogorsk, Belarus
- Height: 1.95 m (6 ft 5 in)
- Weight: 80 kg (176 lb)
- Spike: 309 cm (122 in)
- Block: 290 cm (114 in)

Volleyball information
- Position: Middle-blocker
- Current team: (Azerbaijan) Turan VC
- Number: 22

National team
2019–	Azerbaijan

Mariya Kirilyuk (born 16 February 1995) is an Azerbaijani volleyball player that plays as a middle-blocker for Turan VC and Azerbaijan women's national volleyball team.

== Career ==
Kirilyuk began her professional volleyball career in Azerbaijan, representing clubs such as Lokomotiv Baku, Azerrail Baku, and Mübariz SK. She has competed internationally across European and Asian leagues, including stints in the Russian Superliga with Sparta Nizhny Novgorod, Severyanka Cherepovets, and VC Yenisey, as well as in the Chinese Volleyball Super League with Shenzhen Zhongsai.

She is a core member of the Azerbaijan national team, representing the country in major international tournaments including the Women's European Volleyball Championship (EuroVolley) and the CEV Volleyball European Golden League.
