= Benjamin Fondane =

Romanian-French writer

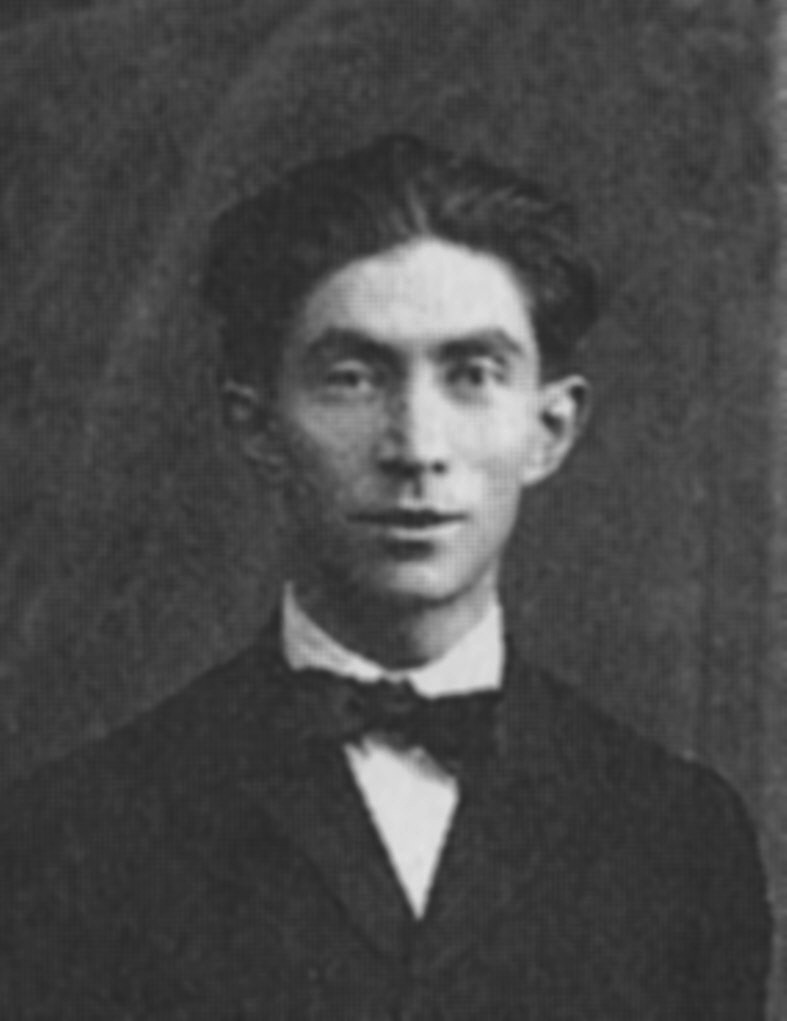
- Fondane-Fundoianu, ca. 1915
- Born: Benjamin Wechsler; November 14, 1898; Iași, Kingdom of Romania
- Died: October 2, 1944 (aged 45); Auschwitz-Birkenau, German-occupied Poland
- Occupations: Poet; dramatist; opinion journalist; critic; philosopher; translator; theater producer; screenwriter; film director; librarian; news presenter
- Writing career
- Pen name: F. Benjamin, Diomed, Dio, Funfurpan, I. Hașir, Isaac Laquedem, Const. Meletie, Mielușon, I. G. Ofir, Al. Vilara, Alex. Vilara, Von Doian
- Period: 1912–1944
- Genres: Biography; epic poetry; essay; free verse; idyll; lyric poetry; memoir; ode; pastiche; pastoral; prose poem; short story; sonnet; travel writing; verse drama
- Movements: Neo-romanticism, symbolism, modernism, avant-garde, Expressionism, surrealism, constructivism, Contimporanul, Sburătorul

Benjamin Fondane (French: [bɛ̃ʒamɛ̃ fɔ̃dan]) or Benjamin Fundoianu (Romanian: [benʒaˈmin fundoˈjanu]; born Benjamin Wechsler, Wexler or Vecsler, first name also Beniamin or Barbu, usually abridged to B.; November 14, 1898 – October 2, 1944) was a Romanian and French poet, critic and existentialist philosopher, also noted for his work in film and theater. Known from his Romanian youth as a Symbolist poet and columnist, he alternated neoromantic and expressionist themes with echoes from Tudor Arghezi, and dedicated several poetic cycles to the rural life of his native Moldavia. Fondane, who was of Jewish Romanian extraction and a nephew of Jewish intellectuals Elias and Moses Schwartzfeld, participated in both minority secular Jewish culture and mainstream Romanian culture. During and after World War I, he was active as a cultural critic, avant-garde promoter and, with his brother-in-law Armand Pascal, manager of the theatrical troupe Insula.

Fondane began a second career in 1923, when he moved to Paris. Affiliated with Surrealism, but strongly opposed to its communist leanings, he moved on to become a figure in Jewish existentialism and a leading disciple of Lev Shestov. His critique of political dogma, rejection of rationalism, expectation of historical catastrophe and belief in the soteriological force of literature were outlined in his celebrated essays on Charles Baudelaire and Arthur Rimbaud, as well as in his final works of poetry. His literary and philosophical activities helped him build close relationships with other intellectuals: Shestov, Emil Cioran, David Gascoyne, Jacques Maritain, Victoria Ocampo, Ilarie Voronca etc. In parallel, Fondane also had a career in cinema: a film critic and a screenwriter for Paramount Pictures, he later worked on Rapt with Dimitri Kirsanoff, and directed the since-lost film Tararira in Argentina.

A prisoner of war during the fall of France, Fondane was released and spent the occupation years in clandestinity. He was eventually captured and handed to Nazi German authorities, who deported him to Auschwitz-Birkenau. He was sent to the gas chamber during the last wave of the Holocaust. His work was largely rediscovered later in the 20th century, when it became the subject of scholarly research and public curiosity in both France and Romania. In the latter country, this revival of interest also sparked a controversy over copyright issues.

== Biography ==
=== Early life ===
Fondane was born in Iași, the cultural capital of Moldavia, on November 14, 1898, but, as he noted in a diary he kept at age 16, his birthday was officially recorded as November 15. Fondane was the only son of Isac Wechsler and his wife Adela (née Schwartzfeld), who also bore daughters Lina (b. 1892) and Rodica (b. 1905), both of whom had careers in acting. As a child Benjamin spends a lot of time in the north of Moldova in a place known as Fundoaia and hence the name he chooses for himself Fundoianu. From this rural and picturesque area he receives the inspiration for the poems that will later be published in a collection called Priveliști "Landscapes" in Hebrew. As a teenage boy, Fundoianu traveled a lot in the north of Moldova, collected and delved into the local Romanian folklore of the villages, and from that too he was inspired to write songs which, according to his words, he started composing at the age of 8. Wechsler was a Jewish man from Hertsa region, his ancestors having been born on the Fundoaia estate (which the poet later used as the basis for his signature). Adela was from an intellectual family, of noted influence within the urban Jewish community: her father, poet B. Schwartzfeld, was the owner of a book collection, while her uncles Elias and Moses both had careers in humanities. Adela herself was well acquainted with the intellectual elite of Iași, Jewish as well as ethnic Romanian, and kept recollections of her encounters with authors linked with the Junimea society. Through Moses Schwartzfeld, Fondane was also related with socialist journalist Avram Steuerman-Rodion, one of the literary men who nurtured the boy's interest in literature.

The young Benjamin was an avid reader, primarily interested in the Moldavian classics of Romanian literature (Ion Neculce, Miron Costin, Dosoftei, Ion Creangă), Romanian traditionalists or neoromantics (Vasile Alecsandri, Ion Luca Caragiale, George Coșbuc, Mihai Eminescu) and French Symbolists. In 1909, after graduating from School No. 1 (an annex of the Trei Ierarhi Monastery), he was admitted into the Alexandru cel Bun secondary school, where he did not excel as a student. A restless youth (he recalled having had his first love affair at age 12, with a girl six years his senior), Fondane twice failed to get his remove before the age of 14.

Benjamin divided his time between the city and his father's native region. The latter's rural landscape impressed him greatly, and, enduring in his memory, became the setting in several of his poems. The adolescent Fondane took extended trips throughout northern Moldavia, making his debut in folkloristics by writing down samples of the narrative and poetic tradition in various Romanian-inhabited localities. Among his childhood friends was the future Yiddish-language writer B. Iosif, with whom he spent his time in Iași's Podul Vechi neighborhood. In this context, Fondane also met Yiddishist poet Iacob Ashel Groper—an encounter which shaped Fondane's intellectual perspectives on Judaism and Jewish history. At the time, Fondane became known to his family and friends as Mielușon (from miel, Romanian for "lamb", and probably in reference to his bushy hairdo), a name which he later used as a colloquial pseudonym.

Although Fondane later claimed to have started writing poetry at age eight, his earliest known contributions to the genre date from 1912, including both pieces of his own and translations from such authors as André Chénier, Joseph Freiherr von Eichendorff, Heinrich Heine and Henri de Régnier. The same year, some of these were published, under the pseudonym I. G. Ofir, in the local literary review Floare Albastră, whose owner, A. L. Zissu, was later a noted novelist and Zionist political figure. Later research proposed that these, like some other efforts of the 1910s, were collective poetry samples, resulting from a collaboration between Fondane and Groper (the former was probably translating the latter's poetic motifs into Romanian). In 1913, Fondane also tried his hand at editing a student journal, signing his editorial with the pen name Van Doian, but only produced several handwritten copies of a single issue.

=== Debut years ===
Fondane's actual debut dates back to 1914, during the time when he became a student at the National High School Iași and formally affiliated with the provincial branch of the nationwide Symbolist movement. That year, samples of lyric poetry were also published in the magazines Valuri and Revista Noastră (whose owner, writer Constanța Hodoș, even offered Fondane a job on the editorial board, probably unaware that she was corresponding with a high school student). Also in 1914, the Moldavian Symbolist venue Absolutio, edited by Isac Ludo, featured pieces he signed with the pen name I. Hașir. Among his National High School colleagues was Alexandru Al. Philippide, the future critic, who remained one of Fondane's best friends (and whose poetry Fondane proposed for publishing in Revista Noastră). Late in 1914, Fondane also began his short collaboration with the Iași Symbolist tribune Vieața Nouă. While several of his poems were published there, the review's founder Ovid Densusianu issued objections to their content, and, in their subsequent correspondence, each writer outlines his stylistic disagreements with the other.

During the first two years of World War I and Romania's neutrality, the young poet established new contacts within the literary environments of Iași and Bucharest. According to his brother-in-law and biographer Paul Daniel, "it is amazing how many pages of poetry, translations, prose, articles, chronicles have been written by Fundoianu in this interval." In 1915, four of his patriotic-themed poems were published on the front page of Dimineața daily, which campaigned for Romanian intervention against the Central Powers (they were the first of several contributions Fondane signed with the pen name Alex. Vilara, later Al. Vilara). His parallel contribution to the Bârlad-based review Revista Critică (originally, Cronica Moldovei) was more strenuous: Fondane declared himself indignant that the editorial staff would not send him the galley proofs, and received instead an irritated reply from manager Al. Ștefănescu; he was eventually featured with poems in three separate issues of Revista Critică. At around that time, he also wrote a memoir of his childhood, Note dintr-un confesional ("Notes from a Confessional").

Around 1915, Fondane was discovered by the journalistic tandem of Tudor Arghezi and Gala Galaction, both of whom were also modernist authors, left-wing militants and Symbolist promoters. The pieces Fondane sent to Arghezi and Galaction's Cronica paper were received with enthusiasm, a reaction which surprised and impressed the young author. Although his poems went unpublished, his Iași-themed article A doua capitală ("The Second Capital"), signed Al. Vilara, was featured in an April 1916 issue. A follower of Arghezi, he was personally involved in raising awareness about Arghezi's unpublished verse, the Agate negre ("Black Diamonds") cycle.

Remaining close friends with Fondane, Galaction later made persistent efforts of introducing him to critic Garabet Ibrăileanu, with the purpose of having him published by the Poporanist Viața Românească review, but Ibrăileanu refused to recognize Fondane as an affiliate. Fondane had more success in contacting Flacăra review and its publisher Constantin Banu: on July 23, 1916, it hosted his sonnet Eglogă marină ("Marine Eclogue"). Between 1915 and 1923, Fondane also had a steady contribution to Romanian-language Jewish periodicals (Lumea Evree, Bar-Kochba, Hasmonaea, Hatikvah), where he published translations from international representatives of Yiddish literature (Hayim Nahman Bialik, Semyon Frug, Abraham Reisen etc.) under the signatures B. Wechsler, B. Fundoianu and F. Benjamin. Fondane also completed work on a translation of the Ahasverus drama, by the Jewish author Herman Heijermans.

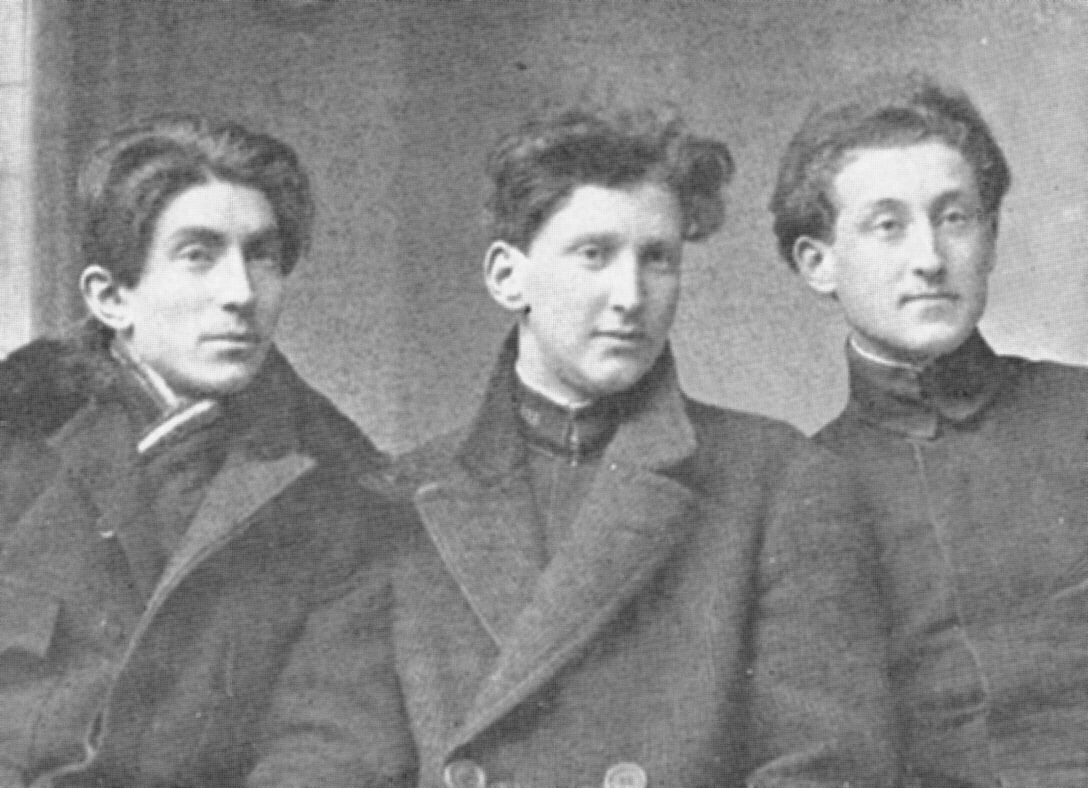
Fondane (left) and F. Brunea-Fox, flanking Iosif Ross. 1915 photograph

His collaboration with the Bucharest-based Rampa (at the time a daily newspaper) also began in 1915, with his debut as theatrical chronicler, and later with his Carpathian-themed series in the travel writing genre, Pe drumuri de munte ("On Mountain Roads"). With almost one signed or unsigned piece per issue over the following years, Fondane was one of the more prolific contributors to that newspaper, and frequently made use of either pseudonyms (Diomed, Dio, Funfurpan, Const. Meletie) or initials (B. F., B. Fd., fd.). These included his January 1916 positive review of Plumb, the first major work by Romania's celebrated Symbolist poet, George Bacovia.

=== In besieged Moldavia and relocation to Bucharest ===
In 1917, after Romania joined the Entente side and was invaded by the Central Powers, Fondane was in Iași, where the Romanian authorities had retreated. It was in this context that he met and befriended the doyen of Romanian Symbolism, poet Ion Minulescu. Minulescu and his wife, author Claudia Millian, had left their home in occupied Bucharest, and, by spring 1917, hosted Fondane at their provisional domicile in Iași. Millian later recalled that her husband had been much impressed by the Moldavian teenager, describing him as "a rare bird" and "a poet of talent". The same year, at age 52, Isac Wechsler fell ill with typhus and died in Iași's Sfântul Spiridon Hospital, leaving his family without financial support.

At around that time, Fondane began work on the poetry cycle Priveliști ("Sights" or "Panoramas", finished in 1923). In 1918, he became one of the contributors to the magazine Chemarea, published in Iași by the leftist journalist N. D. Cocea, with help from Symbolist writer Ion Vinea. In the political climate marked by the Peace of Bucharest and Romania's remilitarization, Fondane used Cocea's publication to protest against the arrest of Arghezi, who had been accused of collaborationism with the Central Powers. In this context, Fondane spoke of Arghezi as being "Romania's greatest contemporary poet" (a verdict which was later to be approved of by mainstream critics). According to one account, Fondane also worked briefly as a fact checker for Arena, a periodical managed by Vinea and N. Porsenna. His time with Chemarea also resulted in the publication of his Biblical-themed short story Tăgăduința lui Petru ("Peter's Denial"). Issued by Chemarea's publishing house in 41 bibliophile copies (20 of which remained in Fondane's possession), it opened with the tract O lămurire despre simbolism ("An Explanation of Symbolism").

In 1919, upon the war's end, Benjamin Fondane settled in Bucharest, where he stayed until 1923. During this interval, he frequently changed domicile: after a stay at his sister Lina's home in Obor area, he moved on Lahovari Street (near Piața Romană), then in Moșilor area, before relocating to Văcărești (a majority Jewish residential area, where he lived in two successive locations), and ultimately to a house a short distance away from Foișorul de Foc. Between these changes of address, he established contacts with the Symbolist and avant-garde society of Bucharest: a personal friend of graphic artist Iosif Ross, he formed an informal avant-garde circle of his own, attended by writers F. Brunea-Fox, Ion Călugăru, Henri Gad, Sașa Pană, Claude Sernet-Cosma and Ilarie Voronca, as well as by artist-director Armand Pascal (who, in 1920, married Lina Fundoianu). Pană would later note his dominant status within the group, describing him as the "stooping green-eyed youth from Iași, the standard-bearer of the iconoclasts and rebels of the new generation".

The group was occasionally joined by other friends, among them Millian and painter Nicolae Tonitza. In addition, Fondane and Călugăru frequented the artistic and literary club established by the controversial Alexandru Bogdan-Pitești, a cultural promoter and political militant whose influence spread over several Symbolist milieus. In a 1922 piece for Rampa, he remembered Bogdan-Pitești in ambivalent terms: "he could not stand moral elevation. [...] He was made of the greatest of joys, in the most purulent of bodies. How many generations of ancient boyars had come to pass, like unworthy dung, for this singular earth to be generated?"

Pressed on by his family and the prospects of financial security, Fondane contemplated becoming a lawyer. Having passed his baccalaureate examination in Bucharest, he was, according to his own account, a registered student at the University of Iași Law School, obtaining a graduation certificate but prevented from becoming a licentiate by the opposition of faculty member A. C. Cuza, the antisemitic political figure. According to a recollection of poet Adrian Maniu, Fondane again worked as a fact checker for some months after his arrival to the capital. His activity as a journalist also allowed him to interview Arnold Davidovich Margolin, statesman of the defunct Ukrainian People's Republic, with whom he discussed the fate of Ukrainian Jews before and after the Soviet Russian takeover.

=== Sburătorul, Contimporanul, Insula ===
Over the following years, he restarted his career in the press, contributing to various nationally circulated newspapers: Adevărul, Adevărul Literar și Artistic, Cuvântul Liber, Mântuirea, etc. The main topics of his interest were literary reviews, essays reviewing the contribution of Romanian and French authors, various art chronicles, and opinion pieces on social or cultural issues. A special case was his collaboration with Mântuirea, a Zionist periodical founded by Zissu, where, between August and October 1919, he published his studies collection Iudaism și elenism ("Judaism and Hellenism"). These pieces, alternating with similar articles by Galaction, showed how the young man's views in cultural anthropology had been shaped by his relationship with Groper (with whom he nevertheless severed all contacts by 1920).

Fondane also renewed his collaboration with Rampa. He and another contributor to the magazine, journalist Tudor Teodorescu-Braniște, carried out a debate in the magazine's pages: Fondane's articles defended Romanian Symbolism against criticism from Teodorescu-Braniște, and offered glimpse into his personal interpretation of Symbolist attitudes. One piece he wrote in 1919, titled Noi, simboliștii ("Us Symbolists") stated his proud affiliation to the current (primarily defined by him as an artistic transposition of eternal idealism), and comprised the slogan: "We are too many not to be strong, and too few not to be intelligent." In May 1920, another of his Rampa contributions spoke out against Octavian Goga, Culture Minister of the Alexandru Averescu executive, who contemplated sacking George Bacovia from his office of clerk. The same year, Lumea Evree published his verse drama fragment Monologul lui Baltazar ("Belshazzar's Soliloquy").

Around the time of his relocation to Bucharest, Fondane first met the moderate modernist critic Eugen Lovinescu, and afterward became both an affiliate of Lovinescu's circle and a contributor to his literary review Sburătorul. Among his first contributions there was a retrospective coverage of the boxing match between Jack Dempsey and Georges Carpentier, which comprised his reflections on the mythical power of sport and the clash of cultures. Although a Sburătorist, he was still in contact with Galaction and the left-wing circles. In June 1921, Galaction paid homage to "the daring Benjamin" in an article for Adevărul Literar și Artistic, calling attention to Fondane's "overwhelming originality."

A year later, Fondane was employed by Vinea's new venue, the prestigious modernist venue Contimporanul. Having debuted in its first issue with a comment on Romanian translation projects (Ferestre spre Occident, "Windows on the Occident"), he was later assigned the theatrical column. Fondane's work was again featured in Flacăra magazine (at the time under Minulescu's direction): the poem Ce simplu ("How Simple") and the essay Istoria Ideii ("The History of the Idea") were both published there in 1922. The same year, with assistance from fellow novelist Felix Aderca, Fondane grouped his earlier essays on French literature as Imagini și cărți din Franța ("Images and Books from France"), published by Editura Socec company. The book included what was probably the first Romanian study of Marcel Proust's contribution as a novelist. The author announced that he was planning a similar volume, grouping essays about Romanian writers, both modernists (Minulescu, Bacovia, Arghezi, Maniu, Galaction) and classics (Alexandru Odobescu, Ion Creangă, Constantin Dobrogeanu-Gherea, Anton Pann), but this work was not published in his lifetime.

Also in 1922, Fondane and Pascal set up the theatrical troupe Insula ("The Island"), which stated its commitment to avant-garde theater. Probably named after Minulescu's earlier Symbolist magazine, the group was likely a local replica of Jean Copeau's nonconformist productions in France. Hosted by the Maison d'Art galleries in Bucharest, the company was joined by, among others, actresses Lina Fundoianu-Pascal and Victoria Mierlescu, and director Sandu Eliad. Other participants were writers (Cocea, Pană, Zissu, Scarlat Callimachi, Mărgărita Miller Verghy, Ion Pillat) and theatrical people (George Ciprian, Marietta Sadova, Soare Z. Soare, Dida Solomon, Alice Sturdza, Ionel Țăranu).

Although it stated its goal of revolutionizing the Romanian repertoire (a goal published as an art manifesto in Contimporanul), Insula produced mostly conventional Symbolist and Neoclassical plays: its inaugural shows included Legenda funigeilor ("Gossamer Legend") by Ștefan Octavian Iosif and Dimitrie Anghel, one of Lord Dunsany's Five Plays and (in Fondane's own translation) Molière's Le Médecin volant. Probably aiming to enrich this program with samples of Yiddish drama, Fondane began, but never finished, a translation of S. Ansky's The Dybbuk. The troupe ceased its activity in 1923, partly because of significant financial difficulties, and partly because of a rise in antisemitic activities, which put its Jewish performers at risk. For a while, Insula survived as a conference group, hosting modernist lectures on classical Romanian literature—with the participation of Symbolist and post-Symbolist authors such as Aderca, Arghezi, Millian, Pillat, Vinea, N. Davidescu, Perpessicius, and Fondane himself. He was at the time working on his own play, Filoctet ("Philoctetes", later finished as Philoctète).

=== Move to France ===
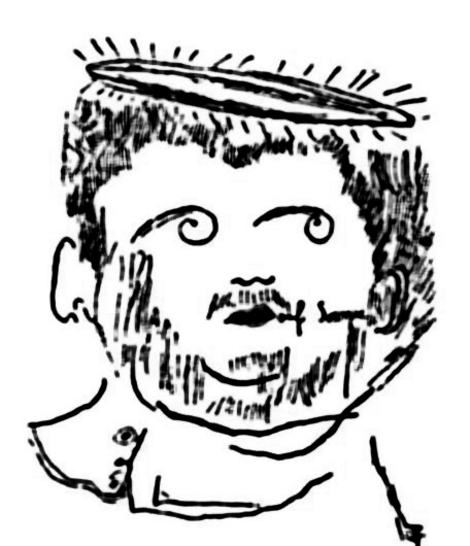
Armand Pascal's self-portrait and last known depiction (1929)

In 1923, Benjamin Fondane eventually left Romania for France, spurred on by the need to prove himself within a different cultural context. He was at the time interested in the success of Dada, an avant-garde movement launched abroad by the Romanian-born author Tristan Tzara, in collaboration with several others. Not dissuaded by the fact that his sister and brother-in-law (the Pascals) had returned impoverished from an extended stay in Paris, Fondane crossed Europe by train and partly by foot.

The writer (who adopted his Francized name shortly after leaving his native country) was eventually joined there by the Pascals. The three of them continued to lead a bohemian and at times precarious existence, discussed in Fondane's correspondence with Romanian novelist Liviu Rebreanu, and described by researcher Ana-Maria Tomescu as "humiliating poverty". The poet acquired some sources of income from his contacts in Romania: in exchange for his contribution to the circulation of Romanian literature in France, he received official funds from the Culture Ministry's directorate (at the time headed by Minulescu); in addition, he published unsigned articles in various newspapers, and even relied on handouts from Romanian actress Elvira Popescu (who visited his home, as did avant-garde painter M. H. Maxy). He also translated into French Zissu's novel Amintirile unui candelabru ("The Recollections of a Chandelier"). For a while, the poet also joined his colleague Ilarie Voronca on the legal department of L'Abeille insurance company.

After a period of renting furnished rooms, Fondane accepted an offer from Jean, brother of the deceased literary theorist Remy de Gourmont, and, employed as a librarian-concierge, moved into the Gourmonts' museum property on Rue des Saints-Pères, some distance away from to the celebrated literary café Les Deux Magots. In the six years before Pascal's 1929 death, Fondane left Gourmont's house and, with his sister and brother-in-law, moved into a succession of houses (on Rue Domat, Rue Jacob, Rue Monge), before settling into a historical building once inhabited by author Bernardin de Saint-Pierre (Rue Rollin, 6). Complaining about eye trouble and exhaustion, and several times threatened with insolvency, Fondane often left Paris for the resort of Arcachon.

Claudia Millian, who was also spending time in Paris, described Fondane's new focus on studying Christian theology and Catholic thought, from Hildebert to Gourmont's own Latin mystique (it was also at this stage that the Romanian writer acquired and sent home part of Gourmont's bibliophile collection). He coupled these activities with an interest in grouping together the cultural segments of the Romanian diaspora: around 1924, he and Millian were founding members of the Society of Romanian Writers in Paris, presided upon by the aristocrat Elena Văcărescu. Meanwhile, Fondane acquired a profile on the local literary scene, and, in his personal notes, claimed to have had his works praised by novelist André Gide and philosopher Jules de Gaultier. They both were his idols: Gide's work had shaped his own contribution in the prose poem genre, while Gaultier did the same for his philosophical outlook. The self-exiled debutant was nevertheless still viewing his career with despair, describing it as languishing, and noting that there was a chance of him failing to earn a solid literary reputation.

=== Surrealist episode ===
The mid-1920s brought Benjamin Fondane's affiliation with Surrealism, the post-Dada avant-garde current centered in Paris. Fondane also rallied with Belgian Surrealist composers E. L. T. Mesens and André Souris (with whom he signed a manifesto on modernist music), and supported Surrealist poet-director Antonin Artaud in his efforts to set up a theater named after Alfred Jarry (which was not, however, an all-Surrealist venue). In this context, he tried to persuade the French Surrealist group to tour his native country and establish contacts with local affiliates.

By 1926, Fondane grew disenchanted with the communist alignment proposed by the main Surrealist faction and its mentor, André Breton. Writing at the time, he commented that the ideological drive could prove fatal: "Perhaps never again will [a poet] recover that absolute freedom that he had in the bourgeois republic." A few years later, the Romanian writer expressed his support for the anti-Breton dissidents of Le Grand Jeu magazine, and was a witness at the 1930 riot which opposed the two factions. His anti-communist discourse was again aired in 1932: commenting on indictment of Surrealist poet Louis Aragon for communist texts (read by the authorities as instigation to murder), Fondane stated that he did believe Aragon's case was covered by the freedom of speech. His ideas also brought him into conflict with Pierre Drieu La Rochelle, who was moving away from an avant-garde background and into the realm of far right ideas. By the early 1930s, Fondane was in contact with the mainstream modernist Jacques Rivière and his Nouvelle Revue Française circle.

In 1928, his own collaboration with the Surrealists took shape as the book Trois scenarii: ciné-poèmes ("Three Scenarios: Cine-poems"), published by Documents internationaux de l'esprit nouveau collection, with artwork by American photographer Man Ray and Romanian painter Alexandru Brătășanu (one of his other contacts in the French Surrealist photographers' group was Eli Lotar, the illegitimate son of Arghezi). The "cine-poems" were intentionally conceived as unfilmable screenplays, in what was his personal statement about artistic compromise between experimental film and the emerging worldwide film industry. The book notably comprised his verdict about cinema being "the only art that was never classical."

=== Philosophical debut ===
With time, Fondane became a contributor to newspapers or literary journals in France, Belgium, and Switzerland: a regular presence in Cahiers du Sud of Marseille, he had his work featured in the Surrealist press (Discontinuité, Le Phare de Neuilly, Bifur), as well as in Le Courrier des Poètes, Le Journal des Poètes, Romain Rolland's Europe, Paul Valéry's Commerce etc. In addition, Fondane's research was hosted by specialized venues such as Revue Philosophique, Schweizer Annalen and Carlo Suarès' Cahiers de l'Étoile. After a long period of indecision, the Romanian poet became a dedicated follower of Lev Shestov, a Russian-born existentialist thinker whose ideas about the eternal opposition between faith and reason he expanded upon in later texts. According to intellectual historian Samuel Moyn, Fondane was, with Rachel Bespaloff, one of the "most significant and devoted of Shestov's followers". In 1929, as a frequenter of Shestov's circle, Fondane also met Argentinian female author Victoria Ocampo, who became his close friend (after 1931, he became a contributor to her modernist review, Sur). Fondane's essays were more frequently than before philosophical in nature: Europe published his tribute Shestov (January 1929) and his comments of Edmund Husserl's phenomenology, which included his own critique of rationalism (June 1930).

Invited (on Ocampo's initiative) by the Amigos del Arte society of Buenos Aires, Fondane left for Argentina and Uruguay in summer 1929. The object of his visit was promoting French cinema with a set of lectures in Buenos Aires, Montevideo and other cities (as he later stated in a Rampa interview with Sarina Cassvan-Pas, he introduced South Americans to the work of Germaine Dulac, Luis Buñuel and Henri Gad). In this context, Fondane met essayist Eduardo Mallea, who invited him to contribute in La Nación's literary supplement. His other activities there included conferencing on Shestov at the University of Buenos Aires and publishing articles on several subjects (from Shestov's philosophy to the poems of Tzara), but the fees received in return were, in his own account, too small to cover the cost of decent living.

In October 1929, Fondane was back in Paris, where he focused on translating and popularizing some of Romanian literature's milestone texts, from Mihai Eminescu's Sărmanul Dionis to the poetry of Ion Barbu, Minulescu, Arghezi and Bacovia. In the same context, the expatriate writer helped introduce Romanians to some of the new European tendencies, becoming, in the words of literary historian Paul Cernat, "the first important promoter of French Surrealism in Romanian culture."

=== Integral and unu ===
In the mid-1920s, Fondane and painter János Mattis-Teutsch joined the external editorial board of Integral magazine, an avant-garde tribune published in Bucharest by Ion Călugăru, F. Brunea-Fox and Voronca. He was assigned a permanent column, known as Fenêtres sur l'Europe/Ferestre spre Europa (French and Romanian for "Windows on Europe"). With Barbu Florian, Fondane became a leading film reviewer for the magazine, pursuing his agenda in favor of non-commercial and "pure" films (such as René Clair's Entr'acte), and praising Charlie Chaplin for his lyricism, but later making some concessions to talkies and the regular Hollywood films. Exploring what he defined as "the great ballet of contemporary French poetry", Fondane also published individual notes on writers Aragon, Jean Cocteau, Joseph Delteil, Paul Éluard and Pierre Reverdy. In 1927, Integral also hosted one of Fondane's replies to the communist Surrealists in France, as Le surréalisme et la révolution ("Surrealism and Revolution").

He also came into contact with unu, the Surrealist venue of Bucharest, which was edited by several of his avant-garde friends at home. His contributions there included a text on Tzara's post-Dada works, which he analyzed as Valéry-like "pure poetry". In December 1928, unu published some of Fondane's messages home, as Scrisori pierdute ("Lost Letters"). Between 1931 and 1934, Fondane was in regular correspondence with the unu writers, in particular Stephan Roll, F. Brunea-Fox and Sașa Pană, being informed about their conflict with Voronca (attacked as a betrayer of the avant-garde) and witnessing from afar the eventual implosion of Romanian Surrealism on the model of French groups. In such dialogues, Roll complains about right-wing political censorship in Romania, and speaks in some detail about his own conversion to Marxism.

With Fondane's approval and Minulescu's assistance, Priveliști also saw print in Romania during 1930. Published by Editura Cultura Națională, it sparked significant controversy with its nonconformist style, but also made the author the target of critics' interest. As a consequence, Fondane was also sending material to Isac Ludo's Adam review, most of it notes (some hostile) clarifying ambiguous biographical detail discussed in Aderca's chronicle to Priveliști. His profile within the local avant-garde was also acknowledged in Italy and Germany: the Milanese magazine Fiera Letteraria commented on his poetry, reprinting fragments originally featured in Integral; in its issue of August–September 1930, the Expressionist tribune Der Sturm published samples of his works, alongside those of nine other Romanian modernists, translated by Leopold Kosch.

As Paul Daniel notes, the polemics surrounding Priveliști only lasted for a year, and Fondane was largely forgotten by the Romanian public after this moment. However, the discovery of Fondane's avant-garde stance by traditionalist circles took the form of bemusement or indignation, which lasted into the next decades. The conservative critic Const. I. Emilian, whose 1931 study discussed modernism as a psychiatric condition, mentioned Fondane as one of the leading "extremists", and deplored his abandonment of traditionalist subjects. Some nine years later, the antisemitic far right newspaper Sfarmă-Piatră, through the voice of Ovidiu Papadima, accused Fondane and "the Jews" of having purposefully maintained "the illusion of a literary movement" under Lovinescu's leadership. Nevertheless, before that date, Lovinescu himself had come to criticize his former pupil (a disagreement which echoed his larger conflict with the unu group). Also in the 1930s, Fondane's work received coverage in the articles of two other maverick modernists: Perpessicius, who viewed it with noted sympathy, and Lucian Boz, who found his new poems touched by "prolixity".

=== Rimbaud le voyou, Ulysse and intellectual prominence ===
Back in France, where he had become Shestov's assistant, Fondane was beginning work on other books: the essay on 19th-century poet Arthur Rimbaud—Rimbaud le voyou ("Rimbaud the Hoodlum")—and, despite an earlier pledge not to return to poetry, a new series of poems. His eponymously titled study-portrait of German philosopher Martin Heidegger was published by Cahiers du Sud in 1932. Despite his earlier rejection of commercial films, Fondane eventually became an employee of Paramount Pictures, probably spurred on by his need to finance a personal project (reputedly, he was accepted there with a second application, his first one having been rejected in 1929). He worked first as an assistant director, before turning to screenwriting. Preserving his interest in Romanian developments, he visited the Paris set of Televiziune, a Romanian cinema production for which he shared directorial credits. His growing interest in Voronca's own poetry led him to review it for Tudor Arghezi's Bucharest periodical, Bilete de Papagal, where he stated: "Mr. Ilarie Voronca is at the top of his form. I'm gladly placing my stakes on him."

In 1931, the poet married Geneviève Tissier, a trained jurist and lapsed Catholic. Their home on Rue Rollin subsequently became a venue for literary sessions, mostly grouping the Cahiers du Sud contributors. The aspiring author Paul Daniel, who became Rodica Wechsler's husband in 1935, attended such meetings with his wife, and recalls having met Gaultier, filmmaker Dimitri Kirsanoff, music critic Boris de Schlözer, poets Yanette Delétang-Tardif and Thérèse Aubray, as well as Shestov's daughter Natalie Baranoff. Fondane also enjoyed a warm friendship with Constantin Brâncuși, the Romanian-born modern sculptor, visiting Brâncuși's workshop on an almost daily basis and writing about his work in Cahiers de l'Étoile. He witnessed first-hand and described Brâncuși's primitivist techniques, likening his work to that of a "savage man".

Rimbaud le voyou was eventually published by Denoël & Steele company in 1933, the same year when Fondane published his poetry volume Ulysse ("Ulysses") with Les Cahiers du Journal des Poètes. The Rimbaud study, partly written as a reply to Roland de Renéville's monograph Rimbaud le Voyant ("Rimbaud the Seer"), consolidated Fondane's international reputation as a critic and literary historian. In the months after its publication, the book earned much praise from scholars and writers—from Joë Bousquet, Jean Cocteau, Benedetto Croce and Louis-Ferdinand Céline, to Jean Cassou, Guillermo de Torre and Miguel de Unamuno. It also found admirers in the English poet David Gascoyne, who was afterward in correspondence with Fondane, and the American novelist Henry Miller. Ulysse itself illustrated Fondane's interest in scholarly issues: he sent one autographed copy to Raïssa Maritain, wife of Jacques Maritain (both of whom were Catholic thinkers). Shortly after this period, the author was surprised to read Voronca's own French-language volume Ulysse dans la cité ("Ulysses in the City"): although puzzled by the similarity of titles with his own collection, he described Voronca as a "great poet." Also then, in Romania, B. Iosif completed the Yiddish translation of Fondane's Psalmul leprosului ("The Leper's Psalm"). The text, left in his care by Fondane before his 1923 departure, was first published in Di Woch, a periodical set up in Romania by poet Jacob Sternberg (October 31, 1934).

=== Anti-fascist causes and filming of Rapt ===
The 1933 establishment of a Nazi regime in Germany brought Fondane into the camp of anti-fascism. In December 1934, his Apelul studențimii ("The Call of Students") was circulated among the Romanian diaspora, and featured passionate calls for awareness: "Tomorrow, in concentration camps, it will be too late". The following year, he outlined his critique of all kinds of totalitarianism, L'Écrivain devant la révolution ("The Writer Facing the Revolution"), supposed to be delivered in front of the Paris-held International Congress of Writers for the Defense of Culture (organized by left-wing and communist intellectuals with support from the Soviet Union). According to historian Martin Stanton, Fondane's activity in film, like Jean-Paul Sartre's parallel beginnings as a novelist, was itself a political statement in support of the Popular Front: "[they were] hoping to introduce critical dimensions in the fields they felt the fascists had colonized." Fondane nevertheless ridiculed the communist version of pacifism as a "parade of big words", noting that it opposed mere slogans to concrete German re-armament. Writing for the film magazine Les Cahiers Jaunes in 1933, he expressed the ambition of creating "an absurd film about something absurd, to satisfy [one's] absurd taste for freedom".

Fondane left the Paramount studios the same year, disappointed with company policies and without having had any screen credit of his own (although, he claimed, there were over 100 Paramount scripts to which he had unsigned contributions). During 1935, he and Kirsanoff were in Switzerland, for the filming of Rapt, with a screenplay by Fondane (adapted from Charles Ferdinand Ramuz's La séparation des races novel). The result was a highly poetic production, and, despite Fondane's still passionate defense of silent film, the first talkie in Kirsanoff's career. The poet was enthusiastic about this collaboration, claiming that it had enjoyed a good reception from Spain to Canada, standing as a manifesto against the success of more "chatty" sound films. In particular, French critics and journalists hailed Rapt as a necessary break with the comédie en vaudeville tradition. In the end, however, the independent product could not compete with the Hollywood industry, which was at the time monopolizing the French market. In parallel with these events, Fondane followed Shestov's personal guidance and, by means of Cahiers du Sud, attacked philosopher Jean Wahl's secular reinterpretation of Søren Kierkegaard's Christian existentialism.

=== From Tararira to World War II ===
Despite selling many copies of his books and having Rapt played at the Panthéon Cinema, Benjamin Fondane was still facing major financial difficulties, accepting a 1936 offer to write and assist in the making of Tararira, an avant-garde musical product of the Argentine film industry. This was his second option: initially, he contemplated filming a version of Ricardo Güiraldes' Don Segundo Sombra, but met opposition from Güiraldes' widow. While en route to Argentina, he became friends with Georgette Gaucher, a Breton woman, with whom he was in correspondence for the rest of his life.

Under contract with the Falma-film company, Fondane was received with honors by the Romanian Argentine community, and, with the unusual cut of his preferred suit, is said to have even become a trendsetter in local fashion. For Ocampo and the Sur staff, literary historian Rosalie Sitman notes, his visit also meant an occasion to defy the xenophobic and antisemitic agenda of Argentine nationalist circles. Centered on the tango, Fondane's film enlisted contributions from some leading figures in several national film and music industries, having Miguel Machinandiarena as producer and John Alton as editor; in starred, among others, Orestes Caviglia, Miguel Gómez Bao and Iris Marga. The manner in which Tararira approached its subject scandalized the Argentine public, and it was eventually rejected by its distributors (no copies survive, but writer Gloria Alcorta, who was present at a private screening, rated it a "masterpiece"). Fondane, who had earlier complained about the actors' resistance to his ideas, left Argentina before the film was actually finished. It was on his return trip that he met Jacques and Raïssa Maritain, with whom he and Geneviève became good friends.

With the money received in Buenos Aires, the writer contemplated returning on a visit to Romania, but he abandoned all such projects later in 1936, instead making his way to France. He followed up on his publishing activity in 1937, when his selected poems, Titanic, saw print. Encouraged by the reception given to Rimbaud le voyou, he published two more essays with Denoël & Steele: La Conscience malheureuse ("The Unhappy Consciousness", 1937) and Faux traité d'esthétique ("False Treatise of Aesthetics", 1938). In 1938, he was working on a collected edition of his Ferestre spre Europa, supposed to be published in Bucharest but never actually seeing print. At around that date, Fondane was also a presenter for the Romanian edition of 20th Century Fox's international newsreel, Movietone News.

In 1939, Fondane was naturalized French. This followed an independent initiative of the Société des écrivains français professional association, in recognition for his contribution to French letters. Cahiers du Sud collected the required 3,000 francs fee through a public subscription, enlisting particularly large contributions from music producer Renaud de Jouvenel (brother of Bertrand de Jouvenel) and philosopher-ethnologist Lucien Lévy-Bruhl. Only months after this event, with the outbreak of World War II, Fondane was drafted into the French Army. During most of the "Phoney War" interval, considered too old for active service, he was in the military reserve force, but in February 1940 was called under arms with the 216 Artillery Regiment. According to Lina, "he left [home] with unimaginable courage and faith." Stationed at the Sainte Assise Castle in Seine-Port, he edited and stenciled a humorous gazette, L'Écho de la I C-ie ("The 1st Company Echo"), where he also published his last-ever work of poetry, Le poète en patrouille ("The Poet on Patrolling Duty").

=== First captivity and clandestine existence ===
Fondane was captured by the Germans in June 1940 (shortly before the fall of France), and was taken into a German camp as a prisoner of war. He managed to escape captivity, but was recaptured in short time. After falling ill with appendicitis, he was transported back to Paris, kept in custody at the Val-de-Grâce, and operated on. Fondane was eventually released, the German occupiers having decided that he was no longer fit for soldierly duty.

He was working on two poetry series, Super Flumina Babylonis (a reference to Psalm 137) and L'Exode ("The Exodus"), as well as on his last essay, focusing on 19th-century poet Charles Baudelaire, and titled Baudelaire et l'expérience du gouffre ("Baudelaire and the Experience of the Abyss"). In addition to these, his other French texts, incomplete or unpublished by 1944, include: the poetic drama pieces Philoctète, Les Puits de Maule ("Maule's Well", an adaptation of Nathaniel Hawthorne's The House of the Seven Gables) and Le Féstin de Balthazar ("Belshazzar's Feast"); a study about the life and work of Romanian-born philosopher Stéphane Lupasco; and the selection from his interviews with Shestov, Sur les rives de l'Illisus ("On the Banks of the Illisus"). His very last text is believed to be a philosophical essay, Le Lundi existentiel ("The Existential Monday"), on which Fondane was working in 1944. Little is known about Provèrbes ("Proverbs"), which, he announced in 1933, was supposed to be an independent collection of poems.

According to various accounts, Fondane made a point of not leaving Paris, despite the growing restrictions and violence. However, others note that, as a precaution against the antisemitic measures in the occupied north, he eventually made his way into the more permissive zone libre, and only made returns to Paris in order to collect his books. Throughout this interval, the poet refused to wear the yellow badge (mandatory for Jews), and, living in permanent risk, isolated himself from his wife, adopting an even more precarious lifestyle. He was still in contact with writers of various ethnic backgrounds, and active on the clandestine literary scene. In this context, Fondane stated his intellectual affiliation to the French Resistance: his former Surrealist colleague Paul Éluard published several of his poems in the pro-communist Europe, under the name of Isaac Laquedem (a nod to the Wandering Jew myth). Such pieces were later included, but left unsigned, in the anthology L'Honneur des poètes ("The Honor of Poets"), published by the Resistance activists as an anti-Nazi manifesto. Fondane also preserved his column in Cahiers du Sud for as long as it was possible, and had his contributions published in several other clandestine journals.

After 1941, Fondane became friends with another Romanian existentialist in France, the younger Emil Cioran. Their closeness signaled an important stage in the latter's career: Cioran was slowly moving away from his fascist sympathies and his antisemitic stance, and, although still connected to the revolutionary fascist Iron Guard, had reintroduced cosmopolitanism to his own critique of Romanian society. In 1943, transcending ideological boundaries, Fondane also had dinner with Mircea Eliade, the Romanian novelist and philosopher, who, like their common friend Cioran, had an ambiguous connection with the far right. In 1942, his own Romanian citizenship rights, granted by the Jewish emancipation of the early 1920s, were lost with the antisemitic legislation adopted by the Ion Antonescu regime, which also officially banned his entire work as "Jewish". At around that time, his old friends outside France made unsuccessful efforts to obtain him a safe conduct to neutral countries. Such initiatives were notably taken by Jacques Maritain from his new home in the United States and by Victoria Ocampo in Argentina.

=== Deportation and death ===
He was eventually arrested by collaborationist forces in spring 1944, after unknown civilians reported his Jewish origin. Held in custody by the Gestapo, he was assigned to the local network of Holocaust perpetrators: after internment in the Drancy transit camp, he was sent on one of the transports to the extermination camps in occupied Poland, reaching Auschwitz-Birkenau. In the meantime, his family and friends remained largely unaware of his fate. After news of his arrest, several of his friends reportedly intervened to save him, including Cioran, Lupasco and writer Jean Paulhan. According to some accounts, such efforts may have also involved another one of Cioran's friends, essayist Eugène Ionesco (later known for his work in drama).

Accounts differ on what happened to his sister Lina. Paul Daniel believes that she decided to go looking for her brother, also went missing, and, in all probability, became a victim of another deportation. Other sources state that she was arrested at around the same time as, or even together with, her brother, and that they were both on the same transport to Auschwitz. According to other accounts, Fondane was in custody while his sister was not, and sent her a final letter from Drancy; Fondane, who had theoretical legal grounds for being spared deportation (a Christian wife), aware that Lina could not invoke them, sacrificed himself to be by her side. While in Drancy, he sent another letter, addressed to Geneviève, in which he asked for all his French poetry to be published in the future as Le Mal des fantômes ("The Ache of Phantoms"). Optimistically, Fondane referred to himself as "the traveler who isn't done traveling".

While Lina is believed to have been marked for death upon arrival (and immediately after sent to the gas chamber), her brother survived the camp conditions for a few more months. He befriended two Jewish doctors, Moscovici and Klein, with whom he spent his free moments engaged in passionate discussions about philosophy and literature. As was later attested by a survivor of the camp, the poet himself was among the 700 inmates selected for extermination on October 2, 1944, when the Birkenau subsection outside Brzezinka was being evicted by SS guards. He was aware of impending death, and reportedly saw it as ironic that it came so near to an expected Allied victory. After a short interval in Block 10, where he is said to have awaited his death with dignity and courage, he was driven to the gas chamber and murdered. His body was cremated, along with those of the other victims.

== Literary work and philosophical contribution ==
=== Symbolist and traditionalist beginnings ===
As a young writer, Benjamin Fondane moved several times between the extremes of Symbolism and neoromantic traditionalism. Literary historian Mircea Martin analyzed the very first of his as pastiches of several, sometimes contradictory, literary sources. These influences, he notes, come from local traditionalists, Romantics and Neoromantics—Octavian Goga (the inspiration for Fondane's earliest pieces), Grigore Alexandrescu, Vasile Alecsandri, George Coșbuc, Ștefan Octavian Iosif; from French Symbolists—Paul Verlaine; and from Romanian disciples of Symbolism—Dimitrie Anghel, George Bacovia, Alexandru Macedonski, Ion Minulescu. The young author had a special appreciation for the 19th century national poet, Mihai Eminescu. Familiar with Eminescu's entire poetic work, he was one of the young poets who tried to reconcile Eminescu's Neoromantic, ruralizing, traditionalism with the urban phenomenon that was Symbolism. While Fondane continued to credit Minulescu's radical and jocular Symbolism as a main influence on his own poems, this encounter was overall less significant than his enthusiasm for Eminescu; in contrast, Bacovia's desolate and macabre poetry left enduring traces in Fondane's work, shaping his depiction of provincial environments and even transforming his worldview.

Fondane's early affiliation with Ovid Densusianu's version of Romania's Symbolist current was, according to literary historian Dumitru Micu, superficial. Micu notes that the young Fondane sent his verse to be published by magazines with incompatible agendas, suggesting that his collaboration with Vieața Nouă was therefore incidental, but also that, around 1914, Fondane's own style was a "conventional Symbolism". Writing in 1915, the poet himself explained that his time with the magazine in question ought not be interpreted as anything other than conjectural. During his polemic with Tudor Teodorescu-Braniște, he defined himself as an advocate of an "insolent" Symbolism, a category defined by and around Remy de Gourmont. This perspective was further clarified in O lămurire..., which explained how Tăgăduința lui Petru was to be read: "A clear, although Symbolist, book. For it is, unmistakably, Symbolist. [...] Symbolism doesn't necessarily mean neologism, morbid, bizarre, decadent, confusing and badly written. But rather—if there is talent—original, commonsensical, depth, non-imitation, lack of standard, subconscious, new and sometimes healthy." From a regional point of view, the young Fondane is sometimes included with Bacovia in the Moldavian branch of Romanian Symbolism, or, more particularly, in the Jewish Moldavian subsection.

The various stylistic directions of Fondane's early poetry came together in Priveliști. Mircea Martin reads in it the poet's emancipation from both Symbolism and traditionalism, despite it being opened with a dedication to Minulescu, and against Eugen Lovinescu's belief that such pastorals were exclusively traditionalist. According to Martin, Priveliști parts from its Romantic predecessors by abandoning the "descriptive" and "sentimentalist" in pastoral conventions: "Everything seems designed on purpose to confound and defy the traditional mindset." Similarly, writer-critic Gheorghe Crăciun found the Priveliști texts contiguous with other early forms of Romanian modernism.

Nevertheless, much of the volume still adheres to lyricism and the conventional idyll format, primarily by identifying itself with the slow rhythms of country life. These traits were subsumed by literary historian George Călinescu into a special category, that of "traditionalist Symbolism", centered on "that which brings man closer to Creation's interior life". The same commentator suggested that the concept linked modernism and traditionalism through the common influence of Charles Baudelaire, whom Fondane himself credited as the "mystical power" behind Priveliști. The cycle also recalls Fondane's familiarity with another pastoral poet, Francis Jammes. Of special note is an ode, Lui Taliarh ("At Thaliarchus"), described by Călinescu as the masterpiece of Priveliști. Directly inspired by Horace's Odes I.9, and seen by Martin as Fondane's will to integrate death into life (or "plenary living"), it equates existence with the seasonal cycle:

Ca mâne, toamna iară se va mări prin grâne,
și vinul toamnei poate nu-l vom mai bea. Ca mâne,
poate s-o duce boii cu ochi de râu în știri,
să tragă cu urechea la noile-ncolțiri.
Și-atuncea, la braț, umbre, nu vom mai ști de toate;
poate-am să uit nevasta și vinul acru; poate...
Ei, poate la ospețe nu vei mai fi monarh.

E toamnă. Bea cotnarul din cupă, Taliarh.

Translation:

Tomorrow maybe, autumn will expand over the fields of grain,
and autumn wine us two we may no longer drink. Tomorrow maybe,
the river-eyed oxen will head for the amaranth,
so they may eavesdrop on the new germination.
And then, shadows arm in arm, we won't remember things;
I might forget my wife and bitter wine; I might...
Well, maybe you'll no longer be a monarch for the feasts.

It's autumn. Drink your cup of cotnar, Taliarchus.

=== Arghezian modernism and Expressionist echoes ===
From its traditionalist core, Priveliști created a modernist structure of uncertainty and violent language. According to Mircea Martin, the two tendencies were so intertwined that one could find both expressed within the same poem. The very preference for vitalism and the energy of wilderness, various critics assess, is a modernist reaction to the drama of World War I, rather than a return to Romantic ideals. In this interval, Fondane had also discovered the poetic revolution promoted by Tudor Arghezi, who united traditionalist discourse with modernist themes, creating new poetic formats. Martin notes that Fondane, more than any other, tried to replicate Arghezi's abrupt prosody and "tooth and nail" approach to the literary language, but lacked his mentor's "verbal magic." The same critic suggests that the main effect of Arghezi's influence on Fondane was not in poetic form, but in determining the disciple to "discover himself", to seek his own independent voice. Paul Cernat also sees Fondane as indebted to Arghezi's mix of "cruelty" and "formal discipline". In contrast to such assessments, Călinescu saw Fondane not as an Arghezian pupil, but as a traditionalist "spiritually related" to Ion Pillat's own post-Symbolist avatar. This verdict was implicitly or explicitly rejected by other commentators: Martin argued that Pillat's omnipresent "calm joy", modulated with "impeccable taste", clashed with Fondane's "tension", "surprises" and "intelligence superior to [his] talent"; Cernat assessed that Priveliști was at "the antipode" of Pillat and Jammes, that its themes pointed to social alienation and a patriarchal universe gone "off its rocker".

Statements made by the young Fondane, in which he explains his indifference toward the landscape as it is, and his preference for the landscape as the poet himself creates it, have been a traditional source for critical commentary. As Martin notes, this attitude led the poet and travel writer to express an apathy, or even boredom, in regard to the wild landscape, to promote "withdrawal" rather than "adhesion", "solitude" rather than "communion". However, as a way of cultivating a cosmic level of poetry, Fondane's work veered into synesthesia and vitalism, being commended by critics for its tactile, aural or olfactory suggestions. In one such poem, cited by Călinescu as a sample of "exquisite freshness", the author imagines being turned into a ripe watermelon. These works also part with convention in matters of prosody (with a modern treatment of alexandrines) and vocabulary (a stated preference for Slavic versus Romance terminologies). In addition, Martin, who declared himself puzzled at noting that Fondane would not publish some of his most accomplished poems of youth, made special note of their occasional disregard for Romanian grammar and other artistic licenses (left uncorrected by Paul Daniel on Fondane's explicit request). Some of the Priveliști poems look upon nature with ostentatious sarcasm, focusing on its grotesque elements, its rawness and its repetitiveness, as well as attacking the idyllic portrayal of peasants in traditionalist literature. Martin notes in particular one of the untitled pieces about Hertsa region:

[...] și trec țărani cu rapăn, ca niște boi; trec boi
cu pântecele pline de miros de trifoi
și idioți de toamnă; și toamna e cuminte
peste țărani, și peste ovăz, și peste linte.

Translation:

[...] and mangy peasants pass, like oxen; oxen pass
with bellies full of clover scent
and autumn idiots; and autumn is cozy
on the peasants, and on oats, and on lentils.

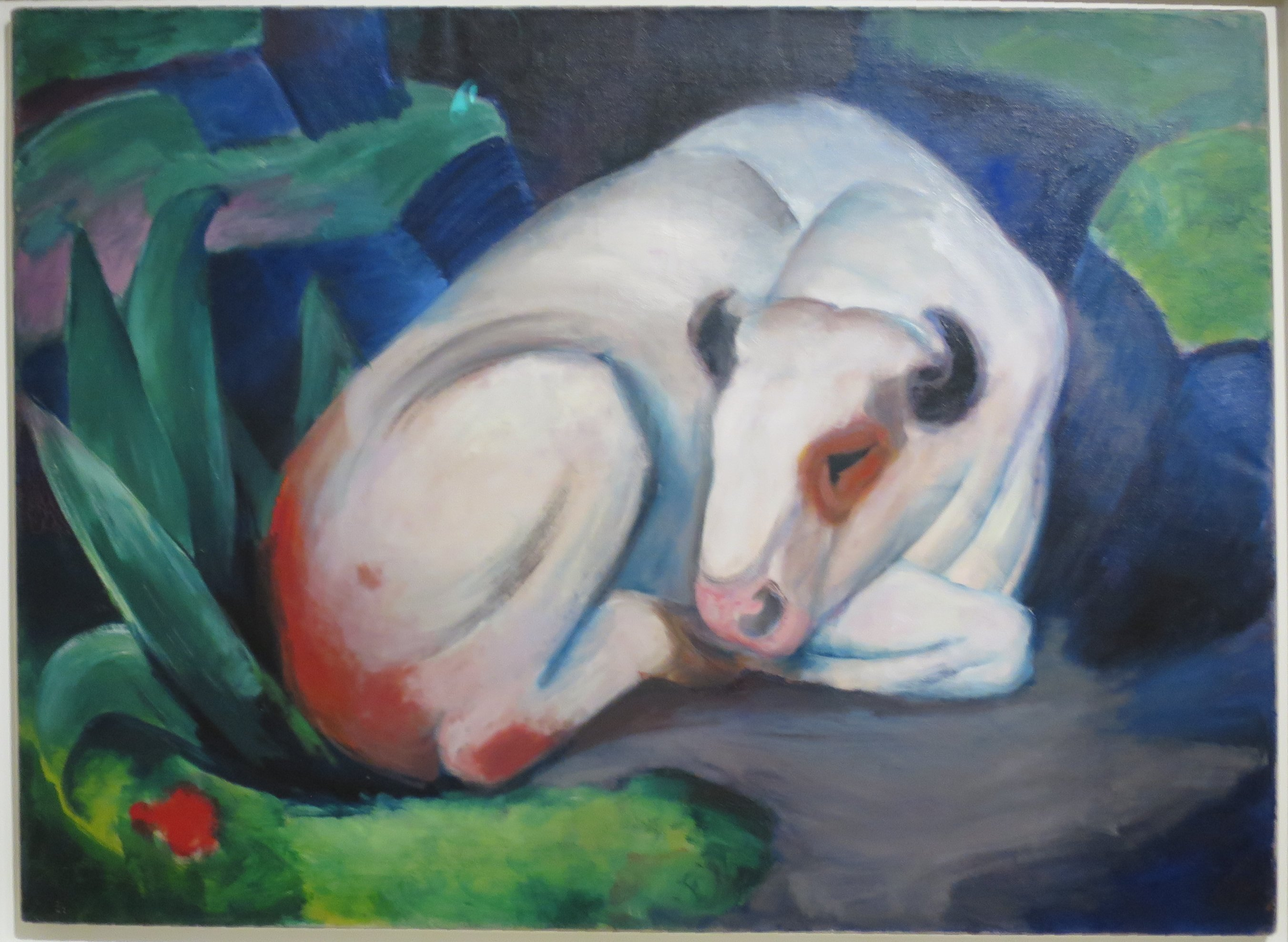
The Bull, 1911 painting by Franz Marc

Literary historian Ovid Crohmălniceanu was the first to suggest, in the 1960s, that the underlying traits of such imagery made the post-Symbolist Fondane an Expressionist poet, who had detected "the fundamental anarchy of the universe". The verdict was echoed and amended by those of other critics. Martin finds that it applies to many of Fondane's early poems, where "explosive" imagery is central, but opines that, generally toned down by melancholy, their message too blends into a new form of "crepuscular wisdom". Scholar Dan Grigorescu stresses that the neo-romantic and symbolist element is dominant throughout the Priveliști volume and, contrary to Crohmălniceanu's thesis, argues that Fondane's projection of the self into the nature is not Expressionist, but rather a convention borrowed from Romanticism (except for "perhaps, [...] the exacerbated dilatation" in scenes in which terrified cattle are driven into town). In Grigorescu's interpretation, the volume has some similarities with the pastoral Expressionism of Romanian writers Lucian Blaga and Adrian Maniu, as well as with the wilderness paintings of Franz Marc, but is at "the opposite pole" from the "morbid hallucination" Expressionism of H. Bonciu and Max Blecher. He indicates that, overall, Fondane's contributions confuse critics by following "contradictory directions", a mix that "hardly finds any grounds for comparison within [Romanian] poetry." In contrast, Paul Cernat sees both Fondane's poetry and Ion Călugăru's prose as "Expressionist écorchés", and connects Fondane's "modern attitude" to his familiarity with the poems of Arthur Rimbaud.

=== Avant-garde critique of parochialism ===
The introduction of rhetorical violence within a traditional poetic setting announced Fondane's transition into the more radical wing of the modernist movement. During his Priveliști period, in his articles for Contimporanul, the poet stated that Symbolism was dead, and in subsequent articles drew a line between the original and non-original sides of Romanian Symbolism, becoming particularly critical of Macedonski. Defining his programmatic approach as leading, through the avant-garde, into a Neoclassical modernism (or a "new Classicism"), Benjamin Fondane argued: "To be excessive: that is the only way of being innovative." His perspective, mixing revolt and messages about creating a new tradition, was relatively close to Contimporanul's own artistic program, and as such a variant of Constructivism. During his own transition from Symbolism, Fondane looked on the avant-garde itself with critical distance. Discussing it as the product of a tradition leading back to Stéphane Mallarmé, he reproached Cubism for displaying a limitation of range, and viewed Futurism as essentially destructive (but also useful for having created a virgin territory to support "constructive man"); likewise, he found Dada a solid, but limited, method of combating interwar period's "metaphysical despair".

The affiliation to the avant-garde came with a sharp critique of Romanian culture, accused by Fondane of promoting imitation and parochialism. During a period which ended with his 1923 departure, the young poet sparked polemic with a series of statements in which, reviewing the impact of local Francophilia, he equated Romania with a colony of France. This theory proposed a difference between Westernization and "parasitism": "If a foreign intellectual direction is always useful, an alien soul is always a danger." He did not cease to promote foreign culture at home, but stated a complex argument about the need to recognize differences in culture: his global conclusion about civilizations, which he viewed as equal but not identical, built on Gourmont's theory about an "intellectual constancy" throughout human history, as well as on philosopher Henri Bergson's critique of mechanism. In parallel, Fondane criticized the cultural setting of Greater Romania, noting that it was so Bucharest-focused that Transylvanian authors only became widely known by attending the capital's Casa Capșa restaurant. In his retrospective interpretation of Romanian literature, the avant-garde essayist stated that there were precious few authors who could be considered original, primarily citing Ion Creangă, the peasant writer, as a model of authenticity. While stating this point in his Imagini și cărți din Franța, Fondane cited in his favor a traditionalist culture critic, historian Nicolae Iorga.

However, during a virtual polemic with Poporanism (hosted by Sburătorul in 1922), Fondane also questioned the originality and Thraco-Roman origin of Romanian folklore, as well as, through it, historical myths surrounding the Latin ethnogenesis: "Present-day Romania, of obscure origins, Thraco-Roman-Slavic-Barbarian, owes its existence and present-day European inclusion to a fecund error [...]: it is the idea of our Latin origin [Fondane's italics]." Likewise, the author put forth the thesis according to which traditionalists such as Mihail Sadoveanu and George Coșbuc invoked literary themes present not just in Romania's archaic tradition, but also in Slavic folklore. Fondane went on to draw a comparison between the idea of Jewish chosenness and that of Romanian Latinity, concluding that they both resulted in positive national goals (in the case of Romania and its inhabitants, that of "becoming part of Europe"). Paul Cernat found his perspective "more reasonable" than that of his Contimporanul colleagues, who speculated about creating a modernity on folkloric roots.

Scholar Constantin Pricop interprets Fondane's overall perspective as that of a "constructive" critic, citing a fragment of Imagini și cărți din Franța: "Let us hope the time will come when we may bring our personal contribution into Europe. [...] Until such time, let's keep a check on the continuous assimilation of foreign culture [...]; let's therefore return to cultural criticism." Commenting at length on the probable motivations of Fondane's discourse, Cernat suggests that, like many of his avant-garde colleagues, Fondane experienced a "peripheral complex", merging Bovarysme and frustrated ambition. According to Cernat, the poet surpassed this moment after experiencing success in France, and his decision to have Priveliști printed at home was intended as a special tribute to Romania and its language. There is however a pronounced difference between Fondane's French and Romanian work, as discussed by critics and by Fondane himself. The elements of continuity are highlighted in Crăciun's account: "French literature and culture signified for Fundoianu a process of clarification and self-definition, but not a change of identity."

=== Jewish tradition and Biblical language ===
Several of Fondane's exegetes have discussed the links between his apparent traditionalism and the classical themes of either secular Jewish culture or Judaism, with a focus on his Hasidic roots. According to Swedish researcher Tom Sandqvist (who discusses the Jewish background of many Romanian avant-garde authors and artists), the Hasidic and Kabbalah connection is enhanced by both the pantheistic vision of Tăgăduința lui Petru and the "Ein Sof-like emptiness" suggested in Priveliști. Paul Cernat too argued that the traditionalist elements in Fondane's work reflected Hasidism as it was experienced in Galicia or Bukovina, as well as the direct influence of Iacob Ashel Groper. According to George Călinescu's analysis (originally stated in 1941), Fondane's origin within the rural minority of Romanian Jews (and not the urban Jewish mainstream) was of special psychological interest: "The poet is a Jew from Moldavia, where Jews have almost pastoral professions, but are nevertheless prevented by a tradition of market agglomerations from fully enjoying the sincerity of rustic life." The fond memory of Judaic practice is notably intertwined with the Priveliști pastorals:

Deodată, după geamuri se aprindeau făclii;
o umbră liniștită intra în prăvălii
prin ușile-ncuiate și s-așeza la masă.
Tăcerea de salină încremenea în casă
și-n sloiul nopții jgheabul ogrăzii adăpa.
Bunicul între flăcări de sfeșnic se ruga:
"Să-mi cadă dreapta, limba să se usuce-n mine
de te-oi lua vreodată-n deșert, Ierusalime!"

Translation:

At once, flames lit up behind windows;
a quiet shadow crept into the shops
through the locked doors and took place at the table.
The silence of a salt mine was tightened in the house
and an icy night flowed into the outside gutter.
Grandfather was praying around candle flames:
"May my right arm fall off, my tongue dry up in me
if ever I take in vain thy name, Jerusalem!"

Fondane expanded on his interest in the Jewish heritage in his early prose and drama. The various pre-1923 articles, including his obituary pieces for Elias Schwartzfeld and Avram Steuerman-Rodion, speak at length about Jewish ethics (which Fondane described as unique and idealistic), assimilation and Jewish nationalism. They also offer his answer to antisemitism, including his case, relying on proof of Jewish exogamy, against all theories about a distinct Semitic race. In other such pieces, he comments at length on Groper's Yiddishist literature and corrects opinions expressed on the same topic by their common friend Gala Galaction. As he explains in this context, Groper quelled his adolescent identity crisis, helping him find a core Judaism, more "vital" to him than the political scope of Zionism. During these dialogues, Fondane recalled, he first discovered his interest in philosophy: he played the "Sophist", paradoxical and abstract, in front of the "sentimental" Groper. This antithesis also inspired the core essay in Iudaism și elenism, where Fondane writes at length about the hostile dialogue between Jewish philosophy, in search of fundamental truths, and Greek thought, with its ultimate value of beauty.

Tăgăduința lui Petru, believed by Mircea Martin to be a sample of Fondane's debt to André Gide, is the first of his works to take inspiration from the Bible (in this case, looking beyond the Talmud). Also Biblical in subject, Monologul lui Baltazar has been interpreted by Crohmălniceanu as a negative comment on nihilism and the Übermensch theory, notions embodied by the protagonist Belshazzar, legendary ruler of Babylon during the Jewish captivity. Fondane's progressive focus on Jewish Biblical sources mirrored the Christian interests of his mentor Arghezi. Like Arghezi, Fondane wrote a series of Psalms—although, according to Martin, his tone was "too cadenced and solemn for one to expect a confrontation or a touching confession". However, Martin notes, the Jewish author either adopted or anticipated (depending on the reliability of his manuscripts' dating) Arghezi's poetry of exhortation and curses, in which ugliness, baseness and destitution speak directly to divinity. These sentiments are found in Fondane's Psalmul leprosului, which the same critic identifies as "the series' masterpiece":

Căci trupul meu se crapă de buboaie —
și din obraji,
vinete coji au curs vânăt puroaie;
[...]
Și sufletul meu, broască, de urât
orăcăie, o, Doamne, către tine.

Translation:

For my body is breaking up in boils—
and from my cheeks,
indigo scabs have leaked indigo pus;
[...]
And my soul, a frog, in desperation
croaks, o my Lord, unto thee.

=== Surrealism, anti-communism and Jewish existentialism ===
Throughout and beyond his participation in the Surrealist milieus (an affiliation illustrated primarily by his filmmaker and popularizer activities, rather than by his literary creation), Benjamin Fondane remained an existentialist, primarily following Lev Shestov's views on the human condition. This came as a critique of the scientific method and rationalism as human explanations of the world, notably outlined in his own Faux traité d'esthétique. Probably developed independently from Shestovist thought, his overall objection toward abstract projects has been likened by essayist Gina Sebastian Alcalay to the later stances of André Glucksmann or Edgar Morin. These attitudes shaped his assessments of Surrealism. In one of Integral chronicles, Fondane himself explained that the movement, described as superior to Dada's "joyous suicide", had created a "new continent" with its rediscovery of dreams. Poet and critic Armelle Chitrit notes that, in part, Fondane's later dissidence was also motivated on an existentialist level, since Surrealism "had stopped asking questions"; instead, she notes, Fondane "believed neither in reason nor in any system based on it. It is folly, he wrote, to perpetuate the attempt to make man and history cohabitable. One of [S]hestov's rare disciples, he sets only the powers of life against those of chaos." As Fondane wrote to Claude Sernet, Rimbaud le voyou was in part at attempt at preventing the other Surrealists from confiscating Rimbaud's mythical status. According to Romanian-born writer Lucian Raicu, its "somber" tone and allusive language are also early clues that Fondane had a nightmarish vision of the political and intellectual climate. His Shestovist interpretation, opposing existence to ideas, was contested by intellectual figure Raymond Queneau: himself a former Surrealist, Queneau suggested that Fondane was relying on blind faith, having a distorted perspective on science, literature and the human intellect. Furthermore, he noted that, under the influence of Lucien Lévy-Bruhl, Fondane described reality exclusively in primitivist terms, as the realm of savagery and superstition.

Fondane's objection to the communist flirtations of the main Surrealist wing had roots in his earlier discourse: before leaving Romania, Fondane had criticized socialism as a modern myth, symptomatic of a generalized desecration, suggesting that Leninist and Labor Zionist projects were economically unsound. Much admired by Emil Cioran for his rejection of all modern ideology, the poet argued that a critical distance imposed itself between artists and social structures, and, although he too reacted against "bourgeois" culture, concluded that communism carried a greater risk for the independent mind. In particular, he objected to the Marxist theory on base and superstructure: although his planned address for the Writers' Congress spoke of Marxian economics as being justified by reality, it also argued that economic relationships could not be used to explain all historical developments. His critique of the Soviet Union as an equally "bourgeois" society also came with the argument that Futurism, not Surrealism, could transform into art the communist version of voluntarism.

Fondane found himself opposed to the general trend of intellectual partisanship, and took pride in defining himself as a politically independent skeptic. Around 1936, he reacted strongly against Julien Benda's rationalist political essays, with their overall critique of intellectual passions, describing them as revived and "excruciatingly boring" versions of positivism, but ignoring their primary, anti-totalitarian, agenda. However, La Conscience malheureuse (with essays on Shestov, Edmund Husserl, Friedrich Nietzsche and Søren Kierkegaard) was noted as Fondane's own contribution to the debate surrounding Popular Front activities and the rise of fascism: titled after a concept in Hegelian philosophy, which originally referred to the thinking process generating its own divisions, it referred to the possibility of thinkers to interact with the larger world, beyond subjectivity.

Rallying himself with the main trends of Jewish existentialism, the poet remained critical of other existentialist schools, such as those of Martin Heidegger and Jean-Paul Sartre, believing them to be overly reliant on dialectics, and therefore on rational thought; likewise, citing Kierkegaard as his reference point, Fondane criticized Jean Wahl for not discussing existential philosophy as an act of faith. His dislike for secular existentialism was also outlined in a text he authored shortly before his 1944 arrest, where he spoke of the Bible as being, "whether or not it wants to", the original reference for all existential philosophy. Geneviève Tissier-Fondane later recalled that her husband was "profoundly Jewish" to his death, but also that he would not abide by any formal regulation within the Halakha tradition. This approach also implied a measure of ecumenism: Jacques Maritain, who cultivated his relationship with Fondane across the religious and philosophical divides, described his friend as "a disciple of Shestov but one inhabited by the Gospel"; Fondane himself explained to Maritain that Shestov and himself were aiming for a new Judaic philosophy that would be equally indebted to the Christianity of Kierkegaard, Martin Luther and Tertullian. He was critical of Maritain's worldview, but remained a passionate reader of his work; in contrast, Geneviève attested that the Maritains' beliefs shaped her own, leasing her back into the Church.

=== Late poetry and drama ===
The spiritual crisis experienced in France was the probable reason why Fondane refused to write poems between 1923 and 1927. As he stated in various contexts, he mistrusted the innate ability of words to convey the tragedy of existence, describing poetry as the best tool for rendering a universal "wordless scream", an "ultimate reality", or an eternal expression of things ephemeral. In his essays, he suggested that the invention of art, like the invention of theory and rhetoric, had deprived poets of their existential function; beyond letting themselves be guided by their art, he argued, writers needed to confirm that the principles of life, negative as well as positive, exist. He saw poets as waging an unequal battle with both scientific perspectives and moralism, urging them to place their unique faith "in the mysterious virtue of poetry, in the existential virtue that poetry upholds". Rimbaud le voyou was in part a study of how, during his self-exile to Harar, Rimbaud had not merely abandoned poetry for the sake of adventure, but rather transformed his lifestyle into a poetry of incertitude and personal ambition. As Fondane explained in his Baudelaire et l'expérience du gouffre, a poet and thinker could also evidence the abyss he faced, and alleviate his own anxiety, through the use of irony: "Laugh in the face of tragedy, or disappear!"

According to Cernat, his articles for Integral show Fondane as an ally of the "anti-political" and lyrical side of Surrealism, a poet placing his trust in "the negative-soteriological, liberating function of poetry". The impact of existentialist philosophy was even traced to the "cine-poems" by Martin Stanton (who called the pieces "amazing"). In contrast to the Surrealists, Fondane did not believe in a need to circulate poems as universal messages, but rather saw them as the basis for a very personal relationship with the reader: "This is not a time for print. Poetry is seeking its friends, not an audience. [...] Poetry will be for the few—or it will not be at all." Chitrit, who parallels Fondane's definitions with the similar views of Romanian poet and Holocaust survivor Paul Celan, concludes: "This is probably the closest that we can come to seeing contemporary poetry." Fondane's other literary works also evidence the impact of his philosophical preoccupations. With Le Féstin de Balthazar, the writer modified his earlier Monologul by adopting Shestivist themes (introducing allegorical characters who discuss Aristotelianism, capitalism and revolution) and by introducing some elements from the burlesque. Originally conceived in 1918 and completed in 1933, Philoctète reworked Sophocles' play of the same title, interpreting it through the style of Gide's dramas.

Ulysse was an epic poem in free verse, the first such work in Fondane's career, and testing a format later adopted in Titanic and L'Exode. Although quite similar to Voronca's own work, which also used Homer's Odyssey as the pretext for a comment on social alienation, it included an additional allegory of Jewishness (according to critic Petre Răileanu, Voronca had stripped his own text of Jewish symbolism, in the hope of not entering a competition with Fondane). Fondane's 1933 text echoes his earlier intertextual Homeric references (present in poems he wrote back in 1914), but, to their adventurous escapism, it opposes the Ithaca metaphor—an ideal of stability in the assumption of one's destiny. Claude Sernet referred to Ulysse as "painful and sober, a cry of anxiety, of revolt and resignation, a fraternal and noble song to mankind". The poem is also Fondane's comment on the Wandering Jew story (the mythical figure is rescaled into an urban Ulysses), and, according to cultural historian Andrei Oișteanu, reinterprets the Christian prejudice about Jews being eternal "witnesses" of Christ's Passion. Together, such motifs intimated the writer's own experiences, leading various commentators to conclude that he too was "the Jewish Ulysses". Italian academic Gisèle Vanhese, who connects this lyrical discourse with Fondane's "experience of the abyss" concept, notes that ocean waters are the vehicles of nomadism in Ulysse, while, in Titanic, the same environment serves as a metaphor of dying.

In Cioran's account, Benjamin Fondane lived his final years permanently aware "of a misfortune that was about to happen", and built a "complicity with the unavoidable". The same is noted by German Romanian poet and Cioran exegete Dieter Schlesak, who suggests: "Fondane was a man who wished to bear the absolute uncertainty of the outside; that which exists is an intermittent, not continuous, reality. But [true misfortune] is the boredom of faint unliving, [...] of things implied, these being the ones [Fondane] hated." Fondane's visions about history and the role of poetry were notably outlined in L'Exode, a portion of which is dedicated to the powerlessness of Jews in front of prejudice. According to Oișteanu, this text, where the narrative voice speaks of sufferings and defects common in all humans, was probably inspired by the famous monologue in William Shakespeare's The Merchant of Venice. Another part, called "astonishingly prophetic" and "cynical apocalyptic" by Chitrit, reads:

Que l'on nous brûle ou que l'on nous cloute
et que se soit chance ou déveine,
que voulez-vous que ça nous foute?
Il n'est de chanson que l'humaine.

Translation:

No matter if you burn or nail us
whether it be good luck or ill
it is to us of little consequence.
There is no chant except the human song.

Similar themes were being explored by the Super Flumina Babylonis cycle, described by Sernet as "a terrible foreshadowing of events into which peoples and continents were about to sink, into which the author himself was to be dragged without the possibility of return." Writing about the entirety of Fondane's French poetry (Le Mal des fantômes), poet and language theorist Henri Meschonnic argued that the Romanian author was unique in depicting "the revolt and the flavor of life mixed into the sense of death".

== Legacy ==
=== Family and estate ===
After her husband's death (of which she was for long ignorant) and the end of the war, Geneviève Tissier-Fondane, aided by the Maritains, moved into Kolbsheim Castle, tutoring the children of Antoinette and Alexander Grunelius. A devout Catholic, she eventually retreated from public life, becoming a nun in the Congregation of Notre-Dame de Sion (dedicated to Catholic missionary work among the Jews). Relocating to the Montagne Sainte-Geneviève, she died, after a long battle with cancer, in March 1954. Fondane was also survived by his mother Adela, who died in June 1953 at age 94, and sister Rodica (d. 1967).

The writer was the subject of several visual portrayals by noted artists, some of whom were his personal friends. During his collaboration with Integral and unu, Victor Brauner and Jules Perahim both drew his vignette portraits (the former as part of a series titled film unu). He is the subject of a 1930 sketch by Constantin Brâncuși, a 1931 Surrealist painting by Brauner (who also painted one of Adela Schwartzfeld), and an artistic photograph by Man Ray. The 1934 edition of Psalmul leprosului featured Fondane's portrait in the hand of graphic artist Sigmund Maur (the original version of which was dated to 1921). A posthumous image of the poet in military attire was drawn by Romanian-born artist Eugen Drăguțescu. Benjamin Fondane was also commemorated with a mention on the Panthéon plaque, among the Morts pour la France (reportedly, his name was added upon a request from Cioran). There is a similar landmark in Iași's Eternitatea cemetery, set up by the Writers' Union of Romania near his family grave.

The poet-philosopher left behind a large manuscript collection, a personal library and a set of works due for publishing. His book collection was split into individual documentary funds, some located in France and others in Romania. In February 1930, Benjamin Fondane explained that he did not consider revisiting his land of birth until such time as his earlier volumes would be printed, indicating that these included (in addition to Priveliști): Ferestre spre Europa, Imagini și scriitori români ("Images and Romanian Writers"), Caietele unui inactual ("The Notebooks of an Outdated Man"), Probleme vesele ("Merry Problems"), Dialoguri ("Dialogues") and an introduction to the work of art critic Walter Pater. Among Fondane's other Romanian works, unpublished at the time of his death, were the prose poem Herța ("Hertsa"), Note dintr-un confesional and many other prose fragments and poems, all preserved in Daniel's manuscript collection. According to Paul Daniel, part of the poet's book collection in Romania was left in the care of literary critic Lucian Boz, who sold it upon his departure for Australia. In France, the copyright to Fondane's work was passed on in the late 20th century to scholar Michel Carassou, who was personally involved in several publication projects.

=== Western echoes ===
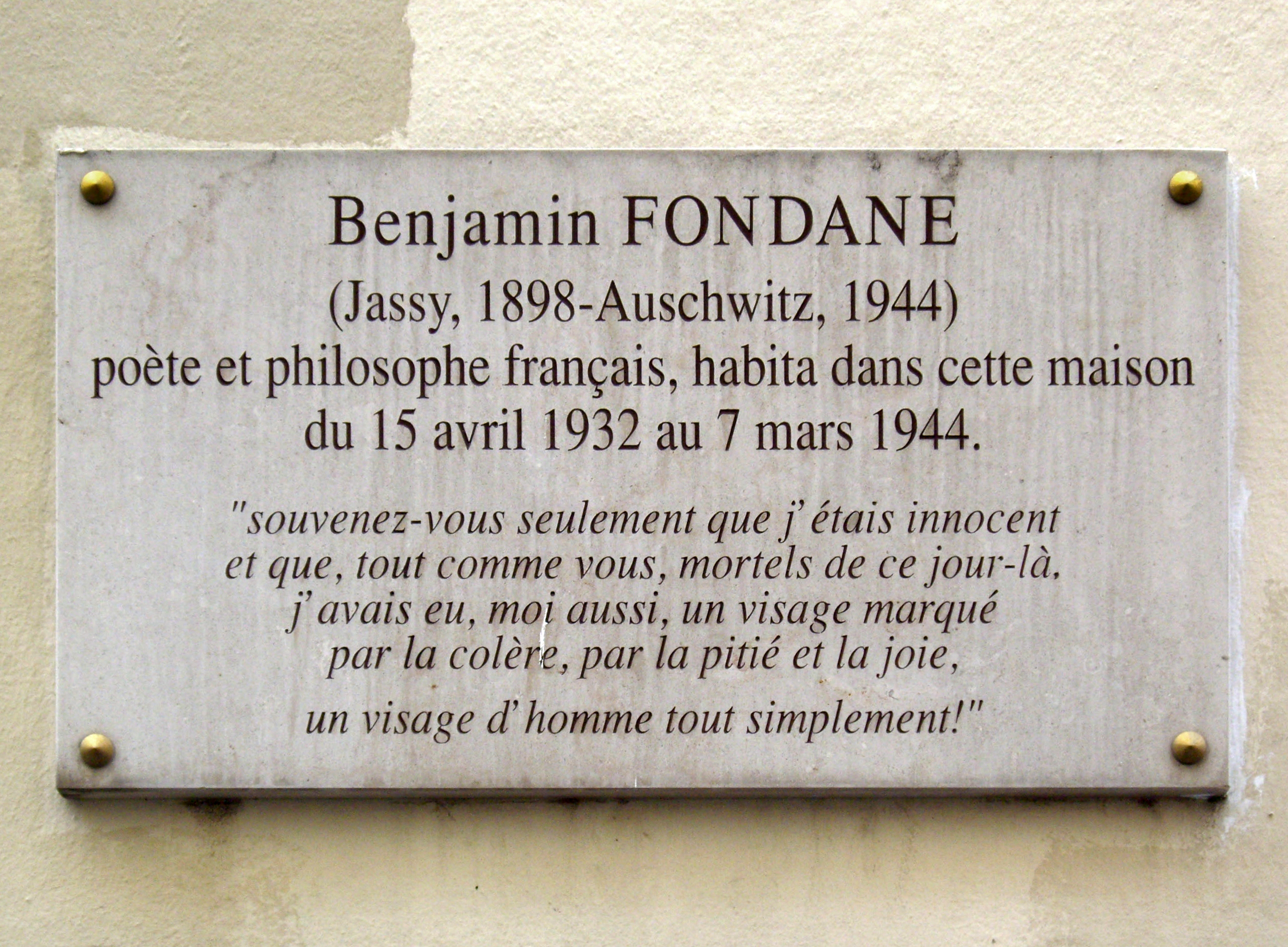
Plaque in memory of Fondane, at his former home on Rue Rollin 6

In France, the caretaker of documentary enterprises regarding Fondane was for long Sernet (Voronca's brother-in-law), who released part of Super Flumina Babylonis and other previously unknown texts (published in various issues of Cahiers du Sud and other journals), while supervising a new edition of L'Honneur des poètes, where Fondane was properly credited. In 1945, philosopher Jean Grenier edited the first-ever version of Le Lundi existentiel. A Fondane reader (comprising L'Exode) was being planned around 1946, and supposed to be published by Les Éditions de Minuit, with contributions from poets Jean Lescure and Paul Éluard. Baudelaire et l'expérience du gouffre was eventually published by Éditions Seghers in 1947, under the supervision of Jean Cassou (second edition 1972; third edition 1973). Sernet was also the author of the poem À Benjamain Fondane, déporté ("To Benjamin Fondane, Upon His Deportation"), reportedly dated June 3, 1944. Recollections of Fondane's activity and his friendship with Victoria Ocampo are also found in Ocampo's series Testimonios ("Testimonies").

With support from Culture Minister André Malraux, Sernet also published a 1965 bound version of L'Exode and Super Flumina..., reconstructed from the fragmentary manuscripts. Also on Sernet's initiative, Le Chant du Monde record label and comedian Ève Griliquez released an LP album of public recitations from his work. Other collections of his written work were published in later years, including his Écrits pour le cinéma ("Writings for the Cinema", 1984), Le Féstin de Balthazar (1985), Le Lundi existentiel (1989), and Le Mal des fantômes (1996). His interviews with Shestov, left by the poet in Ocampo's care, were collected in 1982, as Rencontres avec Léon Chestov ("Meetings with Lev Shestov"). Fondane's notes on Dada, as well as other documents, saw print in 1996, as Le voyageur n'a pas fini de voyager ("The Traveler Isn't Done Traveling"). The following year, Fondane scholar Monique Jutrin discovered and published his manuscript speech for the 1935 Congress, L'Écrivain devant la révolution. Another previously unknown text, the screenplay sketch Une journée d'ivresse ("A Day of Drunkenness"), was included by editors Carassou and Petre Răileanu in a critical edition of 1999.

In the Western world (including the Romanian diaspora), there were a few authors whose work was influenced directly by Fondane's, among them Voronca and David Gascoyne. Gascoyne, the author of "I.M. Benjamin Fondane" poem and recollection pieces on their friendship, spoke of the Romanian as a mentor, with a "decisive and lasting influence" on his own writings. France is home to a Benjamin Fondane Studies Society, which organizes an annual workshop in Peyresq. Since 1994, it publishes the academic review Cahiers Benjamin Fondane, which has recovered and published much of Fondane's correspondence and political texts. In 2006, following a Fondane Society request, a square on Paris' Rue Rollin was renamed in honor of the Romanian-born writer. Three years later, on the 65th commemoration of Fondane's killing, the Mémorial de la Shoah museum hosted a special exhibit dedicated his life and literary work. In Israel, a fragment from his L'Exode is engraved in English and Hebrew versions on the entrance of Yad Vashem memorial.

By the late 1970s, Fondane's Romanian work was attracting researchers and authors of monographs from various other countries, in particular the United States (John Kenneth Hyde, Eric Freedman etc.) and Communist Czechoslovakia (Libuše Valentová). In West Germany, Fondane's poetic and philosophical contributions were in focus by 1986, when exiled poet Dieter Schlesak published translated samples in Akzente journal. Preceded by Gascoyne's French-to-English translation attempts from Fondane, American film editor Julian Semilian's contribution as a translator from Romanian is credited with having played an important part in introducing the English-speaking world to the writings of Fondane and various other Romanian modernists. The first-ever volume of Hebrew translations from Fondane's verse saw print in 2003, with support from Tel Aviv University. Other international echoes include the publication of Odile Serre's Romanian-to-French translations from his early poems.

Recognition of Fondane's overall contribution was however rare, as noted in 1989 by Martin Stanton: "[Fondane is] surely the most underestimated intellectual of the 1930s". Writing some nine years later, Chitrit also argued: "His works [...] are as important as they are unknown." Cioran, who in 1986 dedicated a portion of his Exercises in Admiration collection to his deceased friend, mentioned that Baudelaire et l'expérience du gouffre, made memorable by its study of boredom as a literary subject, had since found numerous readers. Cioran kept a fond memory of his friend, and recalled not being able to pass on Rue Rollin without experiencing "terrible pain". Awareness of Fondane's philosophy was nevertheless judged unsatisfactory by scholar Moshe Idel. Speaking in 2007, he suggested that Fondane the philosopher remained less familiar to Jewish studies academics in Israel than his various counterparts in Germanic Europe.

Argentinian director Edgardo Cozarinsky, who was inspired in his youth by Fondane's introduction of avant-garde films (preserved in the Argentine Film Archives), staged and narrated a dramatized version of his biography, performed at the Villa Ocampo. Fondane scholar Olivier Salazar-Ferrer also authored a theatrical adaptation of L'Exode (premiered by France's Théâtre de La Mouvance company in 2008).

=== Romanian echoes ===
In his native country, Benjamin Fondane was present in the memoirs of several authors. One special case is Arghezi, who, despite his disciple's admiration, left a sarcastic and intentionally demoralizing portrayal of Fondane in his 1930 volume Poarta Neagră. A year after the poet's death at Auschwitz, Arghezi returned with a sympathetic obituary, printed in Revista Fundațiilor Regale. Fondane was also the subject of a Surrealist poem in prose, or "short-circuit", by Stephan Roll, where he was referred to as "a Don Juan of the brain's lineage from God". A very hostile depiction of Fondane and other Jewish writers, noted for its antisemitic undertones, was present in the 1942 memoirs of writer Victor Eftimiu. A reflection of the late 1940s communization of Romania, Sașa Pană's recollection piece De la B. Fundoianu la Benjamin Fondane ("From B. Fundoianu to Benjamin Fondane"), published by Orizont review, reinterpreted some of the poet's activities, and avant-garde history in general, from a partisan Marxist vantage point. Later memoirs mentioning the writer include a piece by Adrian Maniu in the Cluj-based magazine Steaua (December 1963) and a new tribute by Pană in Luceafărul (October 1964). Pană's recollections were later turned into a larger narrative, the 1973 autobiographical novel Născut în 02 ("Born in '02"). Fondane also features prominently in Claudia Millian's Cartea mea de aduceri-aminte ("My Book of Recollections"), published the same year as Pană's volume. Also in 1973, the former Surrealist campaigner Geo Bogza dedicated Fondane an eponymous prose poem, centered on an existential contradiction: "To be born in Moldavia, in sweet, gentle Moldavia... and to end up in the furnaces at Auschwitz." Among the younger Romanian poets, who debuted during communism, Nichita Stănescu was influenced by Priveliști in some of his own earliest works, as was Andrei Codrescu.

Posthumous Romanian editions of Fondane's works included the selection Poezii ("Poems"), edited by the former Surrealist author Virgil Teodorescu (Editura pentru Literatură, 1965), and Daniel's new version of Priveliști (Cartea Românească, 1974), followed in 1978 by the Martin and Daniel selection, and in 1980 by Teodorescu and Martin's Imagini și cărți ("Images and Books", grouping Fondane's French literary studies, as translated by Sorin Mărculescu). Translated by Romulus Vulpescu, Le poète en patrouille was featured in Manuscriptum review (1974). During communism, various Romanian scholars who dedicated significant portions of their work to Fondane studies; in addition to Martin, Ovid Crohmălniceanu and Dumitru Micu, they include: Paul Cornea, Nicolae Manolescu, Dan Mănucă, Marin Mincu, Dan Petrescu, Mihail Petroveanu and Ion Pop. In the 1980s, modern classical composer Doru Popovici completed the cantata In memoriam Beniamin Fundoianu (lyrics by Victor Bârlădeanu).

Writing in 1978, Martin noted that the focus of such recoveries was on Fondane's poetry, while Fondane the thinker and "informed commentator", "one of the most evolved critical voices in 1920s Romanian culture", remained unfamiliar to Romanians. The limits on Fondane's posthumous circulation were partly dictated by the policies of Communist Romania. In 1975, the censorship apparatus (who followed national communist ideas about restricting references to Judaism) removed references to Fondane's ethnic and religious background from a reprint of Arghezi's 1945 text. In 1980, a version of his Mântuirea series, Iudaism și elenism, was purged from Imagini și cărți, on orders from the same institution. Martin's 1984 monograph, Introducere în opera lui B. Fundoianu ("An Introduction to B. Fundoianu's Work"), was saluted as "penetrating" by his colleague Gheorghe Crăciun. The same study is primarily noted by Paul Cernat as a "problem-oriented" text about the "complexes" of Romanian culture, and therefore an implicit reaction against the national communism promoted under Nicolae Ceaușescu.

The hidden parts of Benjamin Fondane's contribution became accessible only after the anti-communist uprising of 1989. In 1999, the Jewish community publishers, Editura Hasefer, issued Iudaism și elenism (with scholars Leon Volovici and Remus Zăstroiu as editors). The same year, the Federation of Jewish Communities of Romania published an anthology of his texts, Strigăt întru eternitate ("A Shout unto Eternity"), and Editura Echinox a concordance dictionary of his poetry (one of several such projects initiated by linguist Marian Papahagi). In 2004, Mircea Martin and Ion Pop also collected Fondane's political essays as Scriitorul în fața revoluției (titled after the Romanian version of L'Écrivain devant la révolution). Writing in 2001, Crăciun assessed that the poet was still "non-integrated" into his native Romanian culture, which mostly perceived him as estranged, and his work in the vernacular as traditionalist.

Eight years later, comparatist Irina Georgescu assessed that interest in the more unknown aspects of Fondane's work had been rekindled by public conferences and new monographs (among which she cites the contributions of scholars Mariana Boca, Nedeea Burcă and Ana-Maria Tomescu). Le Féstin de Balthazar was performed in its Romanian version (Ospățul lui Baltazar), directed by Alexandru Dabija for the Nottara Theater company. The 65th commemoration of Fondane's death was marked locally with several events, including the premiere of Andreea Tănăsescu's Exil în pământul uitării ("Exile to the Land of Oblivion"), a contemporary ballet and performance art show loosely inspired by his poetry. In 2006, the Romanian Cultural Institute set up the Benjamin Fondane International Award for Francophone literature in countries outside France. In 2016, Cătălin Mihuleac published a biographical short story (and eulogy), Ultima țigară a lui Fondane ("Fondane's Last Cigarette").

Fondane's literary posterity was also touched by an extended controversy, notably involving Mircea Martin and philosopher Mihai Șora. The scandal was ignited after October 2007, when Șora and poet Luiza Palanciuc set up the Restitutio Benjamin Fondane translation program, with support from Editura Limes and Observator Cultural magazine. Martin contested this initiative, arguing that he had earlier publicized his intent of editing a Romanian-language Fondane reader, and claiming legal precedence on copyrights. A parallel conflict ensued between Editura Limes and Observator Cultural, after which the Restitutio program split into separate projects.

== Presence in English-language anthologies ==
- Something is still present and isn't, of what's gone. A bilingual anthology of avant-garde and avant-garde inspired Rumanian poetry (translated by Victor Pambuccian), Aracne editrice, Rome, 2018.
- Benjamin Fondane's Ulysses : bilingual edition / translated from the French and with an introduction by Nathaniel Rudavsky-Brody with a foreword by David Rieff. Syracuse University Press 2017.
