= Sincerus =

Sincerus may refer to:

The Latin word for sincere or:

== People ==
- Sincerus, Roman Catholic Bishopric of Amelia in the fifth century

=== Pseudonyms ===
- Samuel Adams (1722-1803) American statesman
- Elias Schwarzfeld (1855–1915), Moldavian and later Romanian Jewish historian, essayist, novelist and newspaperman who wrote as Edmond Sincerus
- Karl-August von Reisach (1800–1869), German Catholic theologian and Cardinal who wrote under Augusts Sincerus
- Sigmund Richter, a probable progenitor of the Order of the Golden and Rosy Cross who used the name Sincerus Renatus
- Peter Joseph Elvenich (1796–1886), German Catholic theologian and philosopher who wrote under Sincerus Pacificus
- Georg Ludwig Oeder, theologian and father of Georg Christian Oeder, who used the pseudonym Sincerus Pistophilus

== Scientific names ==
- Tropidozineus sincerus, a species of beetle
- Adoretus sincerus, a species of beetle
