= Lev Shestov =

Russian existentialist philosopher (1866–1938)

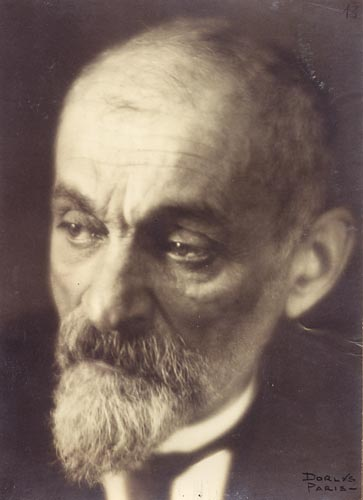
- Shestov in 1927
- Born: Yeguda Lev Shvartsman; February 5, 1866; Kiev, Kiev Governorate, Russian Empire (now Kyiv, Ukraine)
- Died: November 19, 1938 (aged 72); Paris, France

Education
- Education: Imperial Moscow University

Philosophical work
- Era: 20th-century philosophy
- Region: Russian philosophy Western philosophy
- School: Christian existentialism
- Institutions: Institut d'études slaves
- Main interests: Theology, nihilism
- Notable ideas: Despair as "the penultimate word"

Lev Isaakovich Shestov (Russian: Лев Исаакович Шестов; 5 February [O.S. 24 January] 1866 – 19 November 1938), born Yeguda Lev Shvartsman (Russian: Иегуда Лейб Шварцман), was a Russian existentialist and religious philosopher. He is best known for his critiques of both philosophical rationalism and positivism. His work advocated a movement beyond reason and metaphysics, arguing that these are incapable of conclusively establishing truth about ultimate problems, including the nature of God or existence. Contemporary scholars have associated his work with the label "anti-philosophy".

Shestov wrote extensively on philosophers such as Nietzsche and Kierkegaard, as well as Russian writers such as Dostoyevsky, Tolstoy, and Chekhov. His published books include Apotheosis of Groundlessness (1905) and his magnum opus Athens and Jerusalem (1930–1937). After emigrating to France in 1921, he befriended and influenced thinkers such as Edmund Husserl, Benjamin Fondane, Rachel Bespaloff, and Georges Bataille. He lived in Paris until his death in 1938.

== Life ==
Shestov was born Yeguda Lev Shvartsman in Kiev into a Jewish family. He was a cousin of Nicholas Pritzker, a lawyer who emigrated to Chicago and became the patriarch of the Pritzker family that is prominent in business and politics. He obtained an education at various places, due to fractious clashes with authority. He went on to study law and mathematics at the Imperial Moscow University but after a clash with the Inspector of Students he was told to return to Kiev, where he completed his studies.

Shestov's dissertation was rejected by the St. Vladimir's Imperial University of Kiev on account of the revolutionary tendencies it expressed, thus preventing him from becoming a doctor of law. In 1898 he entered a circle of prominent Russian intellectuals and artists which included Nikolai Berdyaev, Sergei Diaghilev, Dmitri Merezhkovsky and Vasily Rozanov. Shestov contributed articles to a journal the circle had established. During this time he completed his first major philosophical work, Good in the Teaching of Tolstoy and Nietzsche: Philosophy and Preaching; two authors profoundly impacting Shestov's thought.

He developed his thinking in a second book on Fyodor Dostoyevsky and Friedrich Nietzsche, which increased Shestov's reputation as an original and incisive thinker. In All Things Are Possible (published in 1905) Shestov adopted the aphoristic style of Friedrich Nietzsche to investigate the difference between Russian and European Literature. Although on the surface it is an exploration of numerous intellectual topics, at its base it is a sardonic work of Existentialist philosophy which both criticizes and satirizes our fundamental attitudes towards life situations. D. H. Lawrence, who wrote the foreword to S.S. Koteliansky's literary translation of the work, summarized Shestov's philosophy with the words: " 'Everything is possible'—this is his really central cry. It is not nihilism. It is only a shaking free of the human psyche from old bonds. The positive central idea is that the human psyche, or soul, really believes in itself, and in nothing else". Shestov deals with key issues such as religion, rationalism, and science in this highly approachable work, topics he would also examine in later writings such as In Job's Balances. Shestov's own key quote from this work is probably the following: "...we need to think that only one assertion has or can have any objective reality: that nothing on earth is impossible. Every time someone wants to force us to admit that there are other, more limited and limiting truths, we must resist with every means we can lay hands on".

Shestov's works were not met with approval even by some of his closest Russian friends. Many saw in Shestov's work a renunciation of reason and metaphysics, and even an espousal of nihilism. Nevertheless, he would find admirers in such writers as D. H. Lawrence and his friend Georges Bataille.

In 1908 Shestov moved to Freiburg, Germany, and he stayed there until 1910, when he moved to a small Swiss village named Coppet. During this time the author worked prolifically. One of the fruits of these labours was the publication of Great Vigils and Penultimate Words. He returned to Moscow in 1915, and in this year his son Sergei died in combat against the Germans. During the Moscow period, his work became more influenced by matters of religion and theology. The seizure of government by the Bolsheviks in 1917 made life difficult for Shestov, and the Marxists pressured him to write a defence of Marxist doctrine as an introduction to his new work, Potestas Clavium; otherwise it would not be published. Shestov refused this, yet with the permission of the authorities he lectured at the University of Kiev on Greek philosophy.

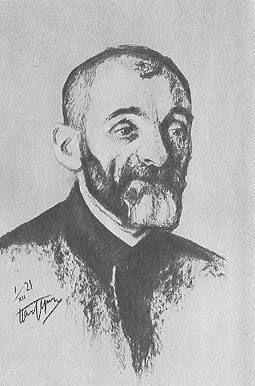
Portrait of Lev Shestov by Leonid Pasternak, 1910.

Shestov's dislike of the Soviet regime led him to undertake a long journey out of Russia, and he eventually ended up in France. The author was a popular figure in France, where his originality was quickly recognized. In Paris, he soon befriended, and much influenced, the young Georges Bataille. He was also close to Eugene and Olga Petit, who helped him and his family relocate to Paris and integrate into the French political and literary circles. That this Russian was newly appreciated is attested by his having been asked to contribute to a prestigious French philosophy journal. In the interwar years, Shestov continued to develop into a thinker of great prominence. During this time he had become totally immersed in the study of such great theologians as Blaise Pascal and Plotinus, whilst at the same time lecturing at the Sorbonne in 1925. In 1926 he was introduced to Edmund Husserl, with whom he maintained a cordial relationship despite radical differences in their philosophical outlook. In 1929, during a return to Freiburg he met with Edmund Husserl, and was urged to study Danish philosopher Søren Kierkegaard.

The discovery of Kierkegaard prompted Shestov to realise that his philosophy shared great similarities, such as his rejection of idealism, and his belief that man can gain ultimate knowledge through ungrounded subjective thought rather than objective reason and verifiability. However, Shestov maintained that Kierkegaard did not pursue this line of thought far enough, and continued where he thought the Dane left off. The results of this tendency are seen in his work Kierkegaard and Existential Philosophy: Vox Clamantis in Deserto, published in 1936, a fundamental work of Christian existentialism.

Despite his weakening condition Shestov continued to write at a quick pace, and finally completed his magnum opus Athens and Jerusalem. This work examines the dichotomy between freedom and reason, and argues that reason be rejected in the discipline of philosophy. Furthermore, it adumbrates the means by which the scientific method has made philosophy and science irreconcilable, since science concerns itself with empirical observation, whereas (so Shestov argues) philosophy must be concerned with freedom, God and immortality, issues that cannot be solved by science.

In 1938, Shestov contracted a serious illness whilst at his vacation home. During this final period, he continued his studies, concentrating in particular on Indian philosophy as well as the works of his contemporary and friend Edmund Husserl, who had died recently. Shestov himself died at a clinic in Paris.

== Philosophy ==
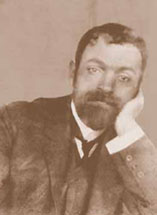
Lev Shestov

Most of Shestov's work is fragmentary and non-systematic. His writing style, often in the form of aphorisms, is more explosive than linear or argumentative. Shestov argues that life itself is fundamentally not comprehensible through rational inquiry. He maintains that no metaphysical speculation can conclusively solve the mysteries of life. Shestov's philosophy places emphasis on the enigmatic qualities of life, rather than on solving philosophical problems.

=== Critique of reason ===
For Shestov, philosophy has employed reason to place humans and God alike in a servile position with respect to "necessities" that are eternally true, unchangeable, and ultimately tyrannical. Shestov does not entirely oppose reason, or science in general, but only rationalism and scientism: the tendency to consider reason as a sort of omniscient, omnipotent God that is eternally true and justified. He points to the work of Aristotle, Spinoza, Leibniz, Kant, and Hegel alike as reflecting belief in an eternal knowledge discoverable through reason—mechanistic, rational laws (i.e. the law of non-contradiction) that would constrain even God by logical necessity.

For Shestov, this tendency to deify reason itself results from fear of an arbitrary, unpredictable, and dangerous God; this causes philosophers to deify that which is unchanging or "dead"—that is, opposed to life and the absolute. Shestov targets this as a repressed flaw in Western philosophy and counters, following Kierkegaard, that God entails the notion that "there is nothing that is impossible"—the absolute need not be limited by reason. For this reason, no conclusive knowledge about the way that things necessarily must be can be arrived at through reason. As he explained in conversation with his student Benjamin Fondane:

I know full well that Necessity reigns now… But who can prove to me that it has always been? That it was not something else before? Or that there will not be something else afterwards? It's up to men to side with Necessity, perhaps... But a philosopher must search for Sources - beyond Necessity, beyond Good and Evil.

In Athens and Jerusalem, he states that, while men seek coherence in life,

Why attribute to God, the God whom neither time nor space limits, the same respect and love for order? Why forever speak of "total unity"? ... There is no need at all. Consequently, the idea of total unity is an absolutely false idea. ... It is not forbidden for reason to speak of unity and even of unities, but it must renounce total unity—and other things besides. And what a sigh of relief men will breathe when they suddenly discover that the living God, the true God, in no way resembles Him whom reason has shown them until now!

Through this attack on "self-evident truths", Shestov implies that we are all seemingly alone with our experience and suffering, and cannot be helped by philosophical systems. Echoing Martin Luther, Dostoyevsky, and Kierkegaard, he argues that true philosophy involves thinking against the limits of prescribed reason and necessity, and can only begin once, "according to the testimony of reason, all possibilities have been exhausted" and "we run up against the wall of impossibility." Shestov's student Fondane explained that genuine reality "begins beyond the limit of the logically impossible" and only once "every humanly thinkable certainty and probability has proven its impossibility." This explains his lack of a systematic philosophical framework. Such ideas would influence Gilles Deleuze decades later.

=== Despair as "the penultimate word" ===
Shestov's point of departure is not a theory, or an idea, but an experience, the experience of despair, which Shestov describes as the loss of certainties, the loss of freedom, the loss of the meaning of life. The root of this despair is what he frequently calls 'Necessity', but also 'Reason', 'Idealism' or 'Fate': a certain way of thinking (but at the same time also a very real aspect of the world) that subordinates life to ideas, abstractions, generalisations and thereby kills it, through an ignoring of the uniqueness and livingness of reality.

But despair is not the last word, it is only the 'penultimate word'. The last word cannot be said in human language, cannot be captured in theory. His philosophy begins with despair, his whole thinking is desperate, but Shestov tries to point to something beyond despair—and beyond philosophy.

This is what he calls 'faith': not a belief, not a certainty, but another way of thinking that arises in the midst of the deepest doubt and insecurity. It is the experience that "everything is possible" (Dostoevsky), that the opposite of Necessity is not chance or accident, but possibility, that there does exist a god-given freedom without boundaries, without walls or borders:

Within the "limits of reason" one can create a science, a sublime ethic, and even a religion; but to find G-d one must tear oneself away from the seductions of reason with all its physical and moral constraints, and go to another source of truth. In Scripture, this source bears the enigmatic name "faith," which is that dimension of thought where truth abandons itself fearlessly and joyously to the entire disposition of the Creator.

Furthermore, although a Jewish philosopher, Shestov saw in the resurrection of Christ this victory over necessity. He described the incarnation and resurrection of Jesus as a transfiguring spectacle by which it is demonstrated that the purpose of life is not "mystical" surrender to the "absolute", but ascetical struggle:

"Cur Deus homo? Why, to what purpose, did He become man, expose himself to injurious mistreatment, ignominious and painful death on the cross? Was it not in order to show man, through His example, that no decision is too hard, that it is worthwhile bearing anything in order not to remain in the womb of the One? That any torture whatever to the living being is better than the 'bliss' of the rest-satiate 'ideal' being?"

Likewise, the final words of his last work, Athens and Jerusalem, are: "Philosophy is not Besinnen [think over] but struggle. And this struggle has no end and will have no end. The kingdom of God, as it is written, is attained through violence." (cf Matthew 11:12)

=== Influence ===
"When I give Shestov's books to anybody, they are usually delighted. There are two authors whom I make propaganda for: one is Herzen, the other is Shestov. They are both totally decent, open-minded, open-hearted human beings."

— Isaiah Berlin

Shestov was highly admired and honored by Nikolai Berdyaev and Sergei Bulgakov in Russia, Jules de Gaultier, Georges Bataille, Lucien Lévy-Bruhl, Paul Celan, Gilles Deleuze, and Albert Camus in France, and D. H. Lawrence, Isaiah Berlin and John Middleton Murry in England. Among Jewish thinkers, he influenced Hillel Zeitlin.

Today, Shestov is relatively little known in the English-speaking world, in part due to limited availability of his works and the unconventional themes he addresses. His writings are characterized by a combination of sombre and ecstatic tones, and his blend of quasi-nihilistic philosophy with a religious perspective presents an unusual and striking contrast.

He did however influence writers such as Albert Camus (who wrote about him in Le Mythe de Sisyphe, The Myth of Sisyphus), Benjamin Fondane (his 'pupil'), the poet Paul Celan, and notably Emil Cioran, who writes about Shestov:

"He was the philosopher of my generation, which didn't succeed in realizing itself spiritually, but remained nostalgic about such a realization. Shestov [...] has played an important role in my life. [...] He thought rightly that the true problems escaped the philosophers. What else do they do but obscure the real torments of life?" (Emil Cioran: Oeuvres, Gallimard, Paris 1995, p. 1740)

Shestov also appears in the work of Gilles Deleuze; he is referred to sporadically in Nietzsche and Philosophy and also appears in Difference and Repetition.

Leo Strauss wrote "Jerusalem and Athens" in part as a response to Shestov's "Athens and Jerusalem".

More recently, Liza Knapp's book The Annihilation of Inertia: Dostoevsky and Metaphysics, refers to Shestov on several occasions.

According to Michael Richardson's research on Georges Bataille, Shestov was an early influence on Bataille and was responsible for exposing him to Nietzsche. He argues that Shestov's radical views on theology and an interest in extreme human behavior probably coloured Bataille's own thoughts.

== Main works ==
These are Shestov's most important works, in their English translations, and with their date of writing:

- The Good in the Teaching of Tolstoy and Nietzsche, 1899.
- The Philosophy of Tragedy, Dostoevsky and Nietzsche, 1903.
- All Things are Possible (Apotheosis of Groundlessness), 1905.
- By Faith Alone, written 1910–1914.
  - English translation: By Faith Alone: The Medieval Church and Martin Luther (2023). Translated by Stephen P. Van Trees. London & New York: Bloomsbury Academic. ISBN 978-1350362314.
- Potestas Clavium, 1919.
- In Job's Balances, 1923–1929.
- Kierkegaard and the Existential Philosophy, 1933–1934.
- Athens and Jerusalem, 1930–1937.
  - English second edition: Athens & Jerusalem (2016). Translated by Bernard Martin, edited by Ramona Fotiade. Athens, Ohio: Ohio University Press. ISBN 978-0821422199.
