= Tropidozineus vicinus =

Scientific classification
- Kingdom: Animalia
- Phylum: Arthropoda
- Class: Insecta
- Order: Coleoptera
- Suborder: Polyphaga
- Infraorder: Cucujiformia
- Family: Cerambycidae
- Genus: Tropidozineus
- Species: T. vicinus

Binomial name
- Tropidozineus vicinus (Melzer, 1931)

Species of beetle

Tropidozineus vicinus is a species of beetle in the family Cerambycidae. It was described by Melzer in 1931.
