= Tropidozineus cinctulus =

Scientific classification
- Kingdom: Animalia
- Phylum: Arthropoda
- Class: Insecta
- Order: Coleoptera
- Suborder: Polyphaga
- Infraorder: Cucujiformia
- Family: Cerambycidae
- Genus: Tropidozineus
- Species: T. cinctulus

Binomial name
- Tropidozineus cinctulus Monné & Martins, 1976

Species of beetle

Tropidozineus cinctulus is a species of beetle in the family Cerambycidae. It was described by Monné and Martins in 1976.
