= Tropidozineus =

Scientific classification
- Kingdom: Animalia
- Phylum: Arthropoda
- Class: Insecta
- Order: Coleoptera
- Suborder: Polyphaga
- Infraorder: Cucujiformia
- Family: Cerambycidae
- Tribe: Acanthocinini
- Genus: Tropidozineus

Genus of beetles

Tropidozineus is a genus of beetles in the family Cerambycidae, containing the following species:

- Tropidozineus albidus Monne, 2009
- Tropidozineus amabilis Monné, 1991
- Tropidozineus argutulus Monné, 1988
- Tropidozineus cinctulus Monné & Martins, 1976
- Tropidozineus complanatus Monné, 1991
- Tropidozineus fulveolus (Lameere, 1884)
- Tropidozineus ignobilis (Bates, 1863)
- Tropidozineus impensus Monné & Martins, 1976
- Tropidozineus inexpectatus (Melzer, 1934)
- Tropidozineus martinsi Monne, 2009
- Tropidozineus pauper (Melzer, 1931)
- Tropidozineus quadricristatus (Melzer, 1935)
- Tropidozineus rotundicollis (Bates, 1863)
- Tropidozineus sincerus Monné, 1988
- Tropidozineus tersus (Melzer, 1931)
- Tropidozineus tuberosus Monné, 1991
- Tropidozineus vicinus (Melzer, 1931)
