= Carlo Suarès =

French writer and painter

Carlo Suarès

Carlo Giuseppe Suarès (1892–1976) was a French writer, painter and Kabbalah author. He was born the 12 May 1892 in Alexandria, Egypt of a very old Sephardi family that arrived in Spain probably with the Arab conquest. The ancestors of his Sephardi Jewish family had been expelled from Spain in 1492 during the Inquisition and found refuge in Tuscany, Italy before emigrating to and settling in Egypt in the 18th century. Expelled from Egypt and dispossessed, he settled in Paris and became a French Citizen. He had a diploma in architecture from the Ecole des Beaux-Arts, and he painted a great deal, having "in true Kabbalistic spirit" sought to discover a synthesis of light. He died in Paris the 16 July 1976.

== Biography ==
Between 1910 and 1914, he studied at the École des Beaux-Arts in Paris. His studies were interrupted by illness and he had to return to Egypt to take care of a heart condition (endocarditis). In 1914, his younger brother died. In 1915, while believing himself to be a French national, Suarès received an order of mobilization by Italy. He did not enlist for one year due to his heart condition, but later served from 1916 to 1918 in the Artillery. After the war, he returned to the École des Beaux-Arts in Paris and obtained a Degree in architecture in 1920.

On December 12, 1922, he married Nadine Tilche. Carlo studied etching in Florence with Celestino Celestini. In 1923, he established a bond of friendship with Jiddu Krishnamurti which lasted for 40 years. Between 1920 and 1924, he practiced architecture in Cairo, Alexandria and in Jaffa.

== The Writer ==
Between 1926 and 1927, while in Alexandria Suarès published and co-edited with Elian J. Finbert "Messages d'Orient", a Review on Eastern and Far-Eastern matters. In 1928, he published in Paris Sur un Orgue de Barbarie.

From 1928 to 1939, Carlo Suarès, in collaboration with Mme de Manziarly published and co-edited in Paris "Les Cahiers de l'Etoile", a monthly review. Publications included texts from Joe Bousquet, Le Corbusier, Krishnamurti, Benjamin Fondane. This was the beginning of a long correspondence with Joë Bousquet.

In 1929, L'Homme et le Moi Selon Krishnamurti was published in Paris.

Carlo Suarès wrote a number of literary critiques, several volumes, such as Le Mythe Judéo-Chrétien, Krishnamurti et l'Unité Humaine, which Suarès translated into French and many other translations into French of Krishnamurti's talks and writings. In 1930, he published La Nouvelle Création, an essay written as a response to a query on the «pacte avec le diable» launched in the Volume 2 of the René Daumal's "Grand Jeu" publication.

A collaborative exchange of notes with René Daumal and Joë Bousquet for the publication of an essay on «dialectique du moi» was published under the title of "La Comédie Psychologique". Most of this correspondence was published in 1955, as a preamble to Critique de la Raison Impure. When the publication of Cahiers de l'Etoile stopped, it is in the Carnets mensuels that La fin du Grand Mythe was published.

In 1945, Suarès started to write again and among his more notable works are: Critique de la Raison Impure, La Kabale des Kabales, De Quelques Apprentis-Sorciers, and the Qabala Trilogy: The Cipher of Genesis, The Song of Songs, and The Sepher Yetzira (Shambhala Publication Inc.). As a writer and philosopher Carlo Suarès spent forty years of his life studying the Qabala.

Carlo Suares met the physicists Jack Sarfatti and Fred Alan Wolf in Paris in 1973 and gave them lessons in his metaphysical ideas. Suares records these meetings in his book The Sepher Yetsira (Shambhala 1976). Sarfatti and Wolf are major figures in MIT physics professor David Kaiser's award-winning book, How the Hippies Saved Physics. Suares's idea to "smash the wall of light" influenced Sarfatti's ideas on post-quantum physics.

=== Bibliography ===
- L'homme et le moi, selon Krishnamurti; Librairie de France, 1928
- La comedie psychologique; Jose Corti, 1932
- Quoi Israel; Adyar, 1932
- Krishnamurti; Adyar, 1936
- Lettre aux Juifs, aux Chretiens, aux Musulmans; Etre libre, 1937
- Le mythe judeo-chretien, d'apres la Genese et les Evangiles selon Mathieu et Jean; Cercle du livre, 1950
- Krishnamurti et l'Unité humaine, 1950 et Adyar 1962
- L'hyperbole chromatique; Cercle Paul Valery, 1957
- La Kabbale des kabbales; Adyar, 1962
- Quelques apprentis sorciers; Etre libre, 1965
- La Bible restituee; Mont-Blanc, 1967
- The Cipher of Genesis; Shambala Publications (USA), 1970; Stuart and Watkins (UK)
- The Cipher of the Song of Songs; Shambala Publications, 1970
- The Passion of Judas; Shambala Publications, 1973
- Les abris mensongers; Editions Robert Laffont, 1973
- Mémoire sur le retour du rabbi qu'on appelle Jésus, Robert Laffont 1975
- The Sephir Yetsira; Shambala Publications, 1976

== The Painter ==
From then until 1939, while living partly in France and partly in Egypt, saw several of his books published. In 1940, being in Egypt and considering his career as a writer to be finished, he turned to painting for research into composition of light, which he expressed by using turquoise blue and rose mauve as the basic colors of his palette. It took him fifteen years of intense work to master his new technique. During this period he wrote his essay on painting L'Hyperbole Chromatique (the Chromatic Hyperbola), was published in 1957 and translated into English soon after.

Suarès' paintings previous to 1958 are figurative. Some are of African inspiration (somewhat surrealistic). Some are inspired by the Bible, other are compositions. Many of these paintings are in Egypt at present.

In 1958 Suarès suddenly realized that his painting and his Qabala were just two aspects of his one aim in life: the rebirth of creative spontaneity. In painting, according to him, this means a special projection or color as light, arranged in such a way as to arouse in the eyes of the spectator a movement, both in width and in depth, and thereby help the psyche in its inner investigations.

Such an art is obviously bound to eliminate every figure, even geometrical. Suarès thus hopes that his painting will be a contribution to the great spiritual values, (religious, in the deepest sense of the word) which lie in non-figurative painting.

=== Painting activities ===
==== 1939-45 ====
In Egypt during the war, Carlo Suarès devoted himself to painting.

- One-man exhibition in Cairo
- Two in Alexandria
- Oils in Cairo, Alexandria, São Paulo (Brazil) museums
- Paintings sold to different collections

==== 1946-58 in Paris ====
One-man exhibitions:

- Galeries Ariel, 2 consecutive years
- Galeries Colette Allendy
- Galerie Suzanne de Coninck
- One oil acquired by Musée d'Art Moderne Paris 50x30 inches

==== 1957 ====
Wrote "l'Hyperbole Chromatique" (a grammar of painting), to explain his new synthesis of light. That text is well known in different European countries and has been reprinted by the official French Review "Couleurs". It has recently been translated into English as: The Chromatic Hyperbola".

==== 1958 ====
The French government sends to Warsaw (Poland) one hundred paintings representative of French Art (one painting for each artist). One oil chosen and given an important place in the Catalogue.

==== 1962 ====
Gallery Rose Freid, NY acquires a couple of paintings (some others left in deposit).

Following Mrs. Freid's death, the remaining paintings were brought back to Paris.

==== 1965 ====
Invited by the museum of Modern Art, Santa Barbara, California, for one-man exhibition. Sells in California about 10 paintings, oils and tempra.

==== 1963 ====
Exhibition of black and white view of NY at the "Procope" in Paris. Standing in Paris are approximately 150 oils belonging to the first figurative period, shipped for the exhibition before confiscation by the Egyptian government of all personal belongings, including more than 100 oils. Also, 300 non-figurative oils painted in Pairs; a series of 20 called "l'Art du Chromatisme", illustrating the "Hyperbole Chromatique", and 150 drawings and water colors.

== See also ==
- Esoteric Subjects
- Carlo Suares: Bibliography: Published Works in French and English and biographical material
