= Tropidozineus ignobilis =

Scientific classification
- Kingdom: Animalia
- Phylum: Arthropoda
- Clade: Pancrustacea
- Class: Insecta
- Order: Coleoptera
- Suborder: Polyphaga
- Infraorder: Cucujiformia
- Family: Cerambycidae
- Genus: Tropidozineus
- Species: T. ignobilis

Binomial name
- Tropidozineus ignobilis (Bates, 1863)

Species of beetle

Tropidozineus ignobilis is a species of beetle in the family Cerambycidae. It was described by Henry Walter Bates in 1863. It is found in Brazil (Rio de Janeiro, Paraná, Santa Catarina).
