= Tropidozineus albidus =

Scientific classification
- Kingdom: Animalia
- Phylum: Arthropoda
- Class: Insecta
- Order: Coleoptera
- Suborder: Polyphaga
- Infraorder: Cucujiformia
- Family: Cerambycidae
- Genus: Tropidozineus
- Species: T. albidus

Binomial name
- Tropidozineus albidus Monne, 2009

Species of beetle

Tropidozineus albidus is a species of beetle in the family Cerambycidae. It was described by Monne in 2009.
