= Tropidozineus inexpectatus =

Scientific classification
- Kingdom: Animalia
- Phylum: Arthropoda
- Class: Insecta
- Order: Coleoptera
- Suborder: Polyphaga
- Infraorder: Cucujiformia
- Family: Cerambycidae
- Genus: Tropidozineus
- Species: T. inexpectatus

Binomial name
- Tropidozineus inexpectatus (Melzer, 1934)

Species of beetle

Tropidozineus inexpectatus is a species of beetle in the family Cerambycidae. It was described by Melzer in 1934.
