= Tropidozineus argutulus =

Scientific classification
- Kingdom: Animalia
- Phylum: Arthropoda
- Class: Insecta
- Order: Coleoptera
- Suborder: Polyphaga
- Infraorder: Cucujiformia
- Family: Cerambycidae
- Genus: Tropidozineus
- Species: T. argutulus

Binomial name
- Tropidozineus argutulus Monne, 1988

Species of beetle

Tropidozineus argutulus is a species of beetle in the family Cerambycidae. It was described by Monne in 1988.
