= Rachel Bespaloff =

Ukrainian-French philosopher

Rachel Bespaloff (1895–1949) was a Ukrainian-French philosopher.

== Life ==
Rachel Bespaloff came from a Jewish family: her father was the Zionist writer and activist Daniel Pasmanik. A disciple of Lev Shestov, Bespaloff took an increasingly critical distance from Shestov throughout the 1930s. She was one of the first French readers of Heidegger, and wrote on Kierkegaard, Gabriel Marcel, André Malraux, and Julien Green. In 1942 she left France for the United States, working for the French section of the Office of War Information before teaching French at Mount Holyoke College. She committed suicide in 1949.

Bespaloff's correspondence with Gabriel Marcel, Daniel Halévy, Boris de Schloezer, Jean-Paul Sartre and Jean Wahl has been posthumously published.

== Works ==
- 'Sur la répétition chez Kierkegaard', Revue Philosophique de la France et de l'Etranger (May–June 1934)
- Cheminements et carrefours: Julien Green, André Malraux, Gabriel Marcel, Kierkegaard, Chestov devant Nietzsche, 1938.
- 'Notes sur les Etudes kierkegaardiennes de Jean Wahl', Revue Philosophique de la France et de l'Etranger (June–July 1939), pp. 301–23.
- 'The Twofold Relationship', Contemporary Jewish Record, 6: 3 (June 1943), pp. 244–53.
- On the Iliad. Translated by Mary McCarthy, with an introduction by Hermann Broch. Pantheon Books. The Bollingen Series IX, Washington, 1947.
- 'L'instant et la liberte chez Montaigne', Deucalion 3 (1950), pp.
- Le monde du condamné à mort, Esprit, January 1950. Translated as 'The World of the Man Condemned to Death', in Germaine Brée, ed., Camus: A Collection of Critical Essays, Prentice-Hall, 1962.
- 'Lettres au R. P. Gaston Fessard', Deucalion 5 (1955), pp. 65–107.
- Lettres à Jean Wahl, 1937-1947: Sur le fond le plus déchiqueté de l'histoire, ed. Monique Jutrin. Paris: Claire Paulhan, 2003.
