= Elias Schwarzfeld =

Romanian Jewish historian, essayist (1855–1915)

Elias Schwarzfeld or Schwartzfeld (Hebrew: אליאס (אליהו) שוורצפלד; March 7, 1855 – 1915) was a Moldavian, later Romanian Jewish historian, essayist, novelist and newspaperman, also known as a political activist and philanthropist. Writing in several languages (Romanian, Yiddish, French), he focused his studies on the Romanian Jewish community, while steadily publishing articles and brochures which confronted antisemitism. The brother of literary historian Moses Schwarzfeld, Elias was the uncle of poet-philosopher Benjamin Fondane.

Harassed and expelled by Romanian authorities, Schwarzfeld settled in France and became a French citizen. While pursuing his literary and scientific activities, he also worked as an assistant to Maurice de Hirsch, managing his various philanthropic projects and, after 1891, the Jewish Colonization Association.

== Biography ==
=== Romanian career ===
Born in Iaşi, Elias Schwarzfeld belonged to a family of intellectual prominence: his father B. Schwarzfeld was a poet and owner of a large book collection. The future writer, who was two years older than Moses, also had a sister, Adela Schwarzfeld-Wechsler (1859 – 1953), mother of Benjamin Fondane. Elias received his early education in the city's public schools, and while still a student, between 1871 and 1873, contributed to the Iaşi papers Curierul de Iaşi and Noul Curier Român. Like his two siblings, Elias was raised within an intellectual environment shaped by Junimea literary society, his family being acquainted with several of Junimea's leading members.

In 1872, Schwarzfeld participated in setting up Vocea Aparătorului (The Defender's Voice), a review started on behalf of the Jews. In May 1874, he founded Revista Israelitică (The Israelites’ Review), in which he published his first Jewish novel, Darascha. From 1874 to 1876, Elias Schwarzfeld studied medicine at the University of Bucharest, abandoning it later to take up the study of law. In 1881 he earned a doctorate in legal studies from the Université Libre de Bruxelles in Belgium.

Between 1877 and 1878, Schwarzfeld edited the Yiddish daily Jüdischer Telegraf; after this had ceased publication, he edited the Yiddish biweekly Ha-Yoetz. During this period, Schwarzfeld became interested in advancing the cause of the non-emancipated Jewish community in the Kingdom of Romania: in 1878 he published his first pamphlet, Chestia şcoalelor israelite şi a progresului israelit în România ("The Issue of Israelite Schools and the Israelite Progress in Romania"), occasioned by a circular which the Alliance Israélite Universelle had issued calling for information regarding the state of education among the Romanian Jews.

In 1881, on settling in Bucharest, he took charge of the paper Fraternitatea ("Brotherhood"). He was at this time one of the principal collaborators on Anuarul pentru Israeliţi ("Yearbook for Israelites"), founded by his brother Moses in 1877. Presided upon by scholar Moses Gaster, the Anuarul pentru Israeliţi staff, Elias included, promoted a moderate assimilationist agenda (Haskalah). It was in this journal that he published, from 1884 to 1898, his numerous studies on the history of the Jews in Romania. In 1883, he published another novel, Rabinul făcător de minuni, conte populaire (The Miraculous Rabbi, a Folk Tale).

Involved with the B'nai B'rith, an international service club for the Jewish communities, he was vice-president of the Fraternitatea lodge, and later as secretary-general of the supreme council of the Jewish lodges of Romania. In 1885 he published, on behalf of coreligionists in the small towns and villages, two pamphlets discussing cases of antisemitic persecution and Jewish reactions: “Radu Porumbaru şi isprăvile lui la Fabrica de Hârtie din Bacău” (“Radu Porumbaru and his Doings at the Bacău Paper Mill”) and ‘”Adevărul asupra revoltei de la Brusturoasa’” (“The Truth about the Revolt in Brusturoasa”).

=== Expulsion and move to France ===
Schwarzfeld's activities having rendered him objectionable to the National Liberal government of Ion Brătianu, he was expelled October 17, 1885, only forty-eight hours being given to him to arrange his personal affairs. Driven out of Romania at roughly the same time as Gaster, who had also spoken out against official antisemitism, he consequently moved to France, settling in Paris. In 1886, he was appointed by Baron Maurice de Hirsch secretary of his private bureau of charity. When Hirsch founded the Jewish Colonization Association (1891), Schwarzfeld became its secretary-general; up to the death of Clara Baroness Hirsch he acted as her secretary in the distribution of her charities. Eventually, Schwarzfeld was naturalized a French citizen.

From Paris, Schwarzfeld continued his literary activity in behalf of his Romanian coreligionists, and he was co-editor of Egalitatea ("Equality"), the Bucharest-based Jewish periodical founded in Bucharest by his brother. He had an international career as an essayist and historian: in 1901, the American Jewish Year Book published his The Jews of Rumania from the Earliest Time to the Present Day and The Situation of the Jews in Rumania Since the Berlin Treaty (1878); an essay on The Jews of Moldavia at the Beginning of the Eighteenth Century appeared in The Jewish Quarterly Review, vol. xvi., and another entitled Deux episodes de l'histoire des juifs roumains in the Revue des Études Juives, vol. xiii. His Les juifs en Roumaine depuis le Traité de Berlin (The Jews of Romania since the Berlin Treaty) appeared under the pseudonym Edmond Sincerus (London, 1901).

Elias Schwarzfeld also completed work on several new novels: in 1890, Bercu Batlen; in 1895, Gângavul (The Stammerer), Beţivul (The Drunkard), Prigonit de soartă (Persecuted by Fate); in 1896, O fată bătrână (An Old Maid), Unchiul Berisch (Uncle Berisch), Un vagabond (A Vagabond), Schimschele Ghibor, Judecata poporană (The People's Judgment); in 1897, Polcovniceasa (The Polkovnik's Wife). Most of these novels have been translated into Hebrew and published by M. Braunstein-Mebaschan. Schwarzfeld also translated into Romanian several novels by, among others, Sámuel Kohn, Leopold Kompert, Marcus Lehman, Ludwig Philippson, Leopold von Sacher-Masoch. In addition, he published Romanian versions of Isidore Loeb's article “Juifs” (“Jews”), Arsène Darmesteter's pamphlet on the Talmud, and the two lectures by Ernest Renan on Judaism.

Elias Schwarzfeld's death was marked with an obituary piece in the Jewish magazine Mântuirea, which was Benjamin Fondane's earliest contribution to this periodical. Fondane praised his uncle as "the only historian of the Romanian Jews", a "living archive", and the wager of a "holy battle" for the defense of Jewish rights. Schwarzfeld's contribution also earned posthumous praise in later decades. Writing in 1999, literary historian Z. Ornea described his predecessor's contribution to the field of Jewish Romanian history as "remarkable". In 2002, Editura Hasefer republished some of Schwarzfeld's scholarly contributions in an anthology edited by historian Lya Benjamin: Evreii în texte istoriografice. It notably includes his posthumously published reply to Romanian ethnic nationalist historian Nicolae Iorga's Istoria evreilor în ţările noastre (The History of the Jews in Our Countries), 1913.
