= Tropidozineus sincerus =

Scientific classification
- Kingdom: Animalia
- Phylum: Arthropoda
- Class: Insecta
- Order: Coleoptera
- Suborder: Polyphaga
- Infraorder: Cucujiformia
- Family: Cerambycidae
- Genus: Tropidozineus
- Species: T. sincerus

Binomial name
- Tropidozineus sincerus Monne, 1988

Species of beetle

Tropidozineus sincerus is a species of beetle in the family Cerambycidae. It was described by Monne in 1988.
