= Gheorghe Crăciun =

Romanian writer and translator

Gheorghe Crăciun (8 May 1950, Zărnești – 30 January 2007, Constanța) was a Romanian writer and translator.

Crăciun was born in Tohanu Vechi, now part of Zărnești, Brașov County. In addition to being a novelist and a translator, he was also a literary theorist. He graduated from High School in Sighișoara, and later studied at the Philology Department of the University of Bucharest. From 1990 he taught at the Department of Literature at Brașov University. In 2002 he received a doctorate in literature from Bucharest University for his thesis on Transitivity in Modernist and Post-Modernist Romanian Poetry. He is considered an important author among Romanian literary figures from the 1980s.

== Bibliography ==
Romanian novels

- Acte originale. Copii legalizate (1982)
- Compunere cu paralele inegale (1988)
- Frumoasa fără corp (1993)
- Pupa russa (2004)

Translated works

- Experiment in Romanian Post-War Literature (1998)
- Images & Texts / lmages et textes (2000)
- Composition aux paralleles inegales (2001)
