= Bovarysme =

Term describing fanciful romantic daydreaming

Bovarysme is a term derived from Gustave Flaubert's Madame Bovary (1857), coined by Jules de Gaultier in his 1892 essay on Flaubert's novel, "Le Bovarysme, la psychologie dans l’œuvre de Flaubert". It denotes a tendency towards escapist daydreaming in which the dreamer imagines themself to be a hero or heroine in a romance, whilst ignoring the everyday realities of the situation. The eponymous Madame Bovary is an example of this.

In his essay "Shakespeare and the Stoicism of Seneca" (1927), T. S. Eliot suggested Othello's last great speech as an example: "I do not believe that any writer has ever exposed this bovarysme, the human will to see things as they are not, more clearly than Shakespeare." Polish researcher, Grzegorz Przepiórka, describe bovarysme as: "a post-romantic phenomenon characterized by an escape from reality into the sphere of illusion, as a result of the influence of cultural texts".

The term bovarysme collectif was used by Arnold van Gennep (1908) to critique self-perception of Liberian people and by Jean Price-Mars in the 1920s to critique Haitian populations' embrace of French forms and rejection of local (Haitian as African diasporic and indigenous) forms.

== See also ==
- Walter Mitty
