= Intellectual property in Romania =

Intellectual property law in Romania has developed significantly in the period since the Romanian Revolution of 1989 because of the need to enforce various regional and international treaties and agreements, such as the Agreement on Trade-Related Aspects of Intellectual Property Rights (TRIPS), the European Directives on Biotechnological Inventions, on Trademarks and Geographical Indications, and on Supplementary protection certificates, the Trademark Law Treaty, the Patent Law Treaty, and the European Union regulation on the Community Trademark, and the need to harmonize domestic patent law with the European Patent Convention (EPC) and with the European Union.

The changes since 1989 cover virtually every aspect of IP law in Romania, including copyright and industrial property, including such relatively new considerations as integrated circuit topographies. The State Office for Inventions and Trademarks protects industrial property, and the Romanian Copyright Office protects copyright and related rights.

== History ==
The first patent granted to a Romanian was in France in 1827 and the first Romanian patent was granted by a royal decree in 1864, during the period when Alexandru Ioan Cuza was prince of both Moldavia and Wallachia, uniting the two by a dynastic union. In 1879, the first trademark law was promulgated, making Romania the seventh country to enact such a law. In 1906, the first patent law was promulgated and the Romanian Office for Industrial Property (now the Romanian State Office for Inventions and Trademarks, OSIM) was founded.

After the Romanian Revolution of 1989, Romania changed its legislation completely in the field of industrial property, which is now based on the mechanisms of the market economy and, generally speaking, harmonized with main international treaties and conventions.

=== International treaties, conventions and agreements signed by Romania ===
Romania is party to the following important treaties, conventions and agreements:

- Paris Convention for the Protection of Industrial Property—1920;
- Madrid Agreement Concerning the International Registration of Marks—1927;
- WIPO Convention—1970;
- European Patent Convention (EPC)—1973;
- Patent Cooperation Treaty—1978;
- Hague Agreement Concerning the International Deposit of Industrial Designs—1992;
- Protocol Relating to the Madrid Agreement—1998;
- Strasbourg, Nice, Vienna and Locarno Agreements on Classifications—1998;
- Trademark Law Treaty—1998;
- Budapest Treaty on the International Recognition of the Deposit of Microorganisms for the Purposes of Patent Procedure —2000;
- UPOV Convention—2001;
- Geneva Act of the Hague Agreement—2001.

In addition, Romania has been a member of the World Trade Organization since 1994.

Romania is additionally taking steps to harmonize its laws with the European Union. In this latter context, Romania has taken the major political decision to join the European Union in 2007.

== See also ==
- Copyright law of Romania
- European patent law
- European trade mark law
