= Ion Pop (writer) =

Romanian university professor

- Born: July 1, 1941 (age 85); Mireșu Mare, Kingdom of Hungary (now Romania)
- Education: Babeș-Bolyai University
- Occupations: Poet, translator, literary critic, historian
- Writing career
- Period: 1965–present

Ion Pop (born 1 July 1941) is a Romanian writer, translator, literary critic, and historian specializing in the study of the Romanian avant-garde. Throughout his career, he has served as a university professor at Babeș-Bolyai University, director of the Romanian Cultural Center in Paris, and dean of the Faculty of Letters in Cluj. He was a key figure in the leadership of the literary magazine Echinox from 1969 to 1983. He was elected a corresponding member of the Romanian Academy in 2015 and became a titular member in 2024.

== Early life and education ==
Ion Pop was born on 1 July 1941 in Mireșu Mare, to Ana (née Teudean) and Vasile Pop. He attended primary school in Mireșu Mare before continuing his education at Elementary School No. 5 (later renamed "Simion Bărnuţiu") and the "Emil Racoviță" High School in Cluj between 1955 and 1959. From 1959 to 1964, he completed his undergraduate studies at the Faculty of Philology at the Babeș-Bolyai University. In 1971, he obtained his doctorate in philology with his thesis titled Avangardismul poetic românesc [The Romanian poetic avant-garde].

== Academic career ==
In 1964, Pop began teaching at Babeș-Bolyai University, holding positions successively as a junior assistant from 1964 to 1966, an assistant from 1966 to 1971, a lecturer from 1972 to 1989, and a university professor from 1990 until 2007. Between 1973 and 1976, he worked as an associate assistant at the Sorbonne Nouvelle University.

Pop served as the director of the Romanian Cultural Center in Paris from 1990 to 1993. He served as the Dean of the Faculty of Letters from 1996 to 2000. In 2015, he became a corresponding member of the Romanian Academy, and he was elevated to a titular member in 2024.

== Literary and editorial activity ==
Pop made his literary debut with verses published in 1959 in the cultural magazine Steaua. In 1963, a selection of his poems was published in Luceafărul, accompanied by an introductory presentation written by Mircea Zaciu. His editorial debut occurred in 1966 with the poetry collection Propuneri pentru o fântână [Proposals for a well]. In 1969, he published both his first volume of literary criticism, Avangardismul poetic românesc, and his second book of poetry, Biata mea cumințenie.

From 1969 until 1973, Pop served as the editor-in-chief of the student magazine Echinox [Equinox]. Following his departure for Paris, he transitioned to the role of director of the publication, a post he held until 1983. Alongside Marian Papahagi (who became editor-in-chief in 1973) and Ion Vartic (assistant editor-in-chief from 1972), Pop formed the editorial leadership team that managed successive groups of writers until a structural change was mandated by communist authorities in 1983. During his tenure at Echinox, Pop regularly published editorials, poetry, literary chronicles, interviews, and translations from French and German.

During his stay in France, Pop co-edited a 1976 special issue of the magazine Les Lettres nouvelles entitled Écrivains roumains d'aujourd'hui [Romanian writers of today] in collaboration with writer Dumitru Țepeneag. His collected dialogues and interviews with French and Swiss authors were compiled into the two-volume publication Ore franceze [French hours] (1979–2002), the first volume of which received the Writers' Union Prize.

Pop contributed to several academic collective projects, including Scriitori români. Mic dicționar [Romanian writers. A short dictionary] (1978) and the four-volume Dicționarul scriitorilor români [Dictionary of Romanian writers] (1995–2002). He also coordinated the four-volume reference work Dicționar analitic de opere literare românești [Analytic dictionary of Romanian literary works] (1998–2003).

== Selected Works ==
- Propuneri pentru o fântână, București, 1966
- Avangardismul poetic românesc, București, 1969
- Biata mea cumințenie, București, 1969
- Poezia unei generații, Cluj, 1973
- Transcrieri, Cluj-Napoca, 1976
- Gramatică târzie, Cluj-Napoca, 1977
- Ore franceze, vol. I, București, 1979, vol. II, Iași, 2002
- Nichita Stănescu. Spațiul și măștile poeziei, București, 1980 ed. 2, București, 2011
- Lucian Blaga. Universul liric, București, 1981
- Lecturi fragmentare, București, 1983
- Jocul poeziei, București, 1985 ed. 2, Cluj-Napoca, 2006
- Soarele și uitarea, Cluj-Napoca, 1985
- Amânarea generală, Cluj-Napoca, 1990
- Avangarda în literatura română, București, 1990 ed. 2, București, 2000
- A scrie și a fi. Ilarie Voronca și metamorfozele poeziei, București, 1993 ed. 2, București, 2007
- Recapitulări, București, 1995
- Pagini transparente. Lecturi din poezia română contemporană, Cluj-Napoca, 1997
- Gellu Naum. Poezia contra literaturii, Cluj-Napoca, 2001
- Viață și texte, Cluj-Napoca, 2001
- Descoperirea ochiului, pref. Gheorghe Grigurcu, București, 2002
- Elegii în ofensivă, București, 2003
- Lucian Blaga în 10 poeme, Cluj-Napoca, 2004
- Introducere în avangarda literară românească, București, 2007
- „Echinox”. Vocile poeziei, Cluj-Napoca, 2008
- Litere și albine, Cluj-Napoca, 2010
- Din avangardă spre ariergardă, București, 2010
- În fața mării, Cluj-Napoca, 2011
- Interviuri. Între biografie și bibliografie, Cluj-Napoca, 2011
- Dezordinea de zi. Publicistică 2000–2011, Cluj-Napoca, 2012
- Scara din bibliotecă, eseuri critice, Cluj-Napoca, 2013
- Poeme 1976-2011, Cluj-Napoca, 2015
- Poezia românească neomodernistă, Cluj-Napoca, 2018
- Ore, zile, ani de prietenie. Corespondență Ion Pop-Mircea Zaciu, Cluj-Napoca, 2019
- Lista de așteptare, versuri, Cluj-Napoca, 2019

=== Translations ===
- Georges Poulet, Conștiința critică (La conscience critique), București, 1979
- Jean Starobinski, Textul și interpretul, București, 1985, 1789. Emblemele rațiunii, București, 1990
- Gérard Genette, Introducere în arhitext. Ficțiune și dicțiune, București, 1994
- Tristan Tzara, Şapte manifeste Dada. Lampisterii. Omul aproximativ, București, 1996
- Tzvetan Todorov, Omul dezrădăcinat, Iași, 1999
- Paul Ricoeur, De la text la acțiune, Cluj-Napoca, 1999
- Paul Morand, București, Cluj-Napoca, 2000
