= Eugen Drăguțescu =

Romanian painter and graphic artist

Eugen Drăguţescu (1914-1992) was a notable Romanian painter and graphic artist.
