= Jules de Gaultier =

French philosopher and essayist (1858–1942)

Jules de Gaultier (1858 in Paris – 1942 in Boulogne-sur-Seine), born Jules Achille de Gaultier de Laguionie, was a French philosopher and essayist. He was a contributor to Mercure de France and one of the chief advocates of "nietzscheism" in vogue in the literary circles of the day. He was known especially for his theory of "bovarysme" (the name taken from Flaubert's novel), by which he meant the continual need of humans to invent themselves, to lie to themselves. His books include De Kant à Nietzsche (1900) and Le Bovarysme, essai sur le pouvoir d'imaginer (1902).
