= Great Synagogue (Constanța) =

Synagogue in Constanța, Romania

Coordinates: 44°10′28.2″N 28°39′24″E

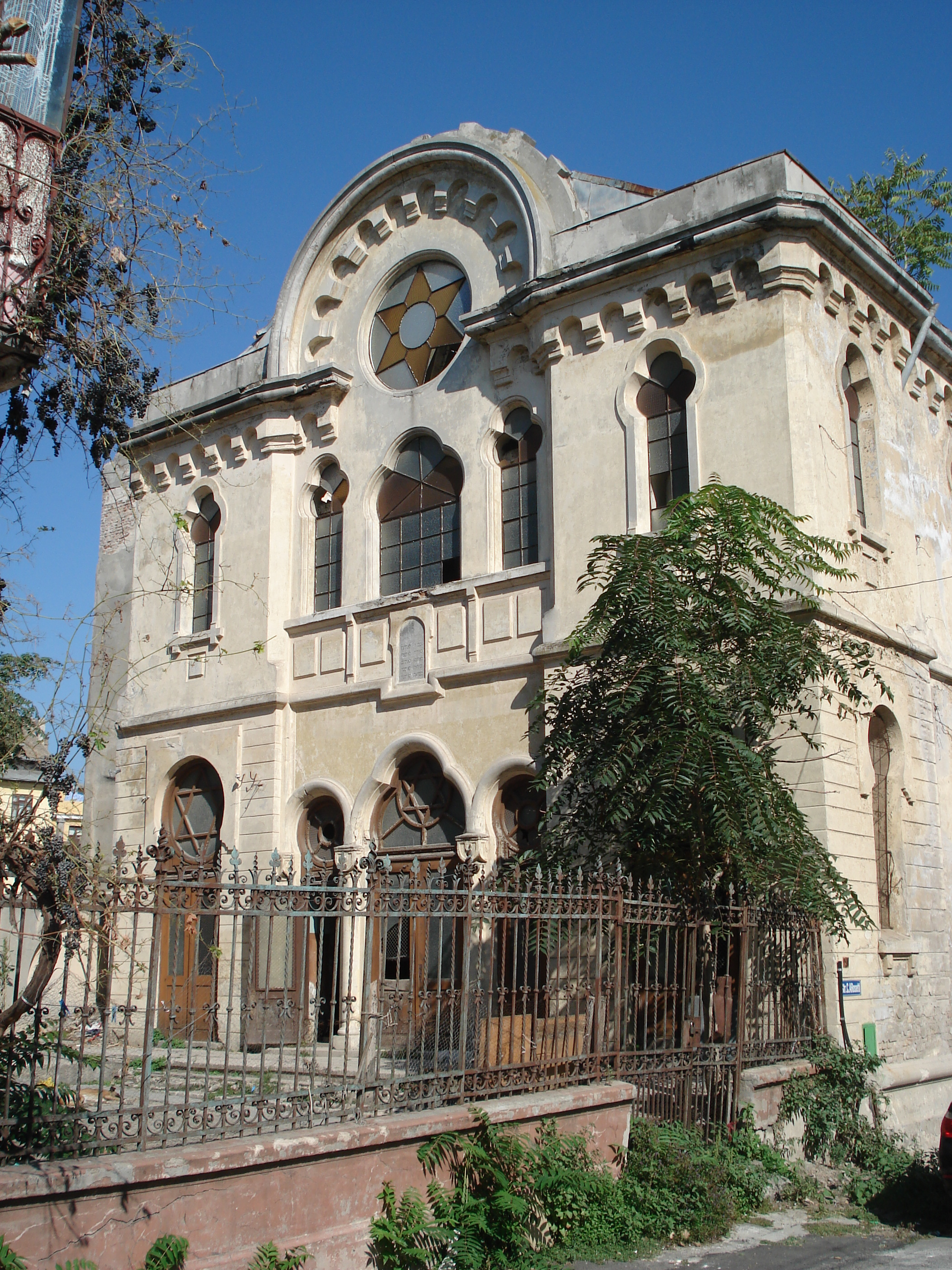
- in 2006

Religion
- Affiliation: Judaism
- Status: Restored

Location
- Location: Constanța, Romania
- Interactive map of Great Synagogue

Architecture
- Architect: Anghel Păunescu
- Style: Moorish Revival
- Groundbreaking: 1910
- Completed: 1914

The Great Synagogue of Constanța is a synagogue, located at 2 C. A. Rosetti Street in Constanța, Romania. In May 2026, the once abandoned synagogue was reopened following years of restoration.

== History ==
The synagogue was built between 1910 and 1914 in a Moorish Revival architectural style on the site of an earlier synagogue, erected between 1867 and 1872 after a firman of Sultan Abdul Aziz. The first steps were initiated in 1907 by the president of the community, M. Bujes. However the original building application submitted in 1908 was denied due to concerns about the strength of the proposed dome and galleries. Architect Anghel Păunescu thus replaced the proposed dome with a semi-cylindrical vault intended to express the same "seduction of the curved space".

In the interwar period, there had been two main synagogues in Constanța: there was also the Sephardic Temple, built between 1905 and 1908 in a Catalan Gothic architectural style, The Sephardic synagogue was heavily damaged during the Second World War when it was used as an ammunition warehouse, further damaged by an earthquake, and was demolished in 1989 under the rule of Nicolae Ceaușescu.

As the Jewish population in Constanța declined, the synagogue fell into disuse. Photographs show the synagogue was still in use - and in good repair - as recently as 1996, but once abandoned, the building had been "ransacked of anything not nailed down". The structure of the building is still standing, but is in an advanced state of degradation and is in danger of collapsing.

Only three of the four walls are intact, and the roof has partially collapsed. A tree grows in the middle of the sanctuary and most of the stained glass windows have been smashed.

Journalists Florin Anghel and Cristian Andrei Leonte blamed local officials and popular opinion for allowing the building to "crumble to the point of collapse", noting that synagogues in other cities were "splendidly renovated and converted into cultural centres or exhibition halls." Aurel Vainer, president of the Federation of the Jewish Communities in Romania (FCER), blamed lack of interest for the deterioration of the synagogue.

In November 2014, a team of architects from Bucharest were hired to inspect the building, assess the necessary repairs and estimate costs. In 2019, there was an outcry from the local Jewish community and in Israel after an unauthorized lingerie photo shoot was held in the synagogue and pictures were posted online.

In June 2023, the president of the Romanian Jewish community announced that a contract to restore the synagogue had been signed.

In March 2026, the restoration of the synagogue was completed following efforts lasting many years to rescue the historic building from ruin. The 15.7 million lei (rought $3.6 million USD as of March 2026) restoration project was funded by the Romanian Ministry of Development via the National Investment Company. The building's structure was stabilised and its design elements that were originally built in the Moorish Revival style were restored.

In May 2026, a reopening ceremony was held for the synagogue with hundreds in attendance, including the local Jewish community and their representatives, Romanian government officials, the Israeli ambassador to Romania, and the local mufti.

== Architecture ==
The synagogue has three levels. The exterior doors and windows display a Moorish influence. Inside, the worship area is divided into three naves with traditional Jewish decorations.

== Images ==
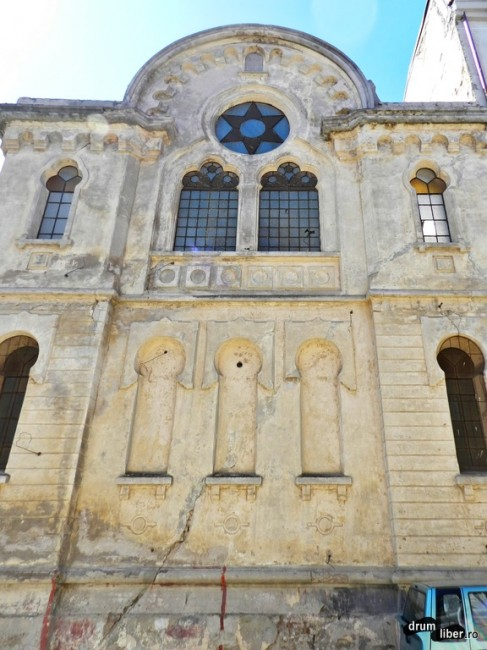

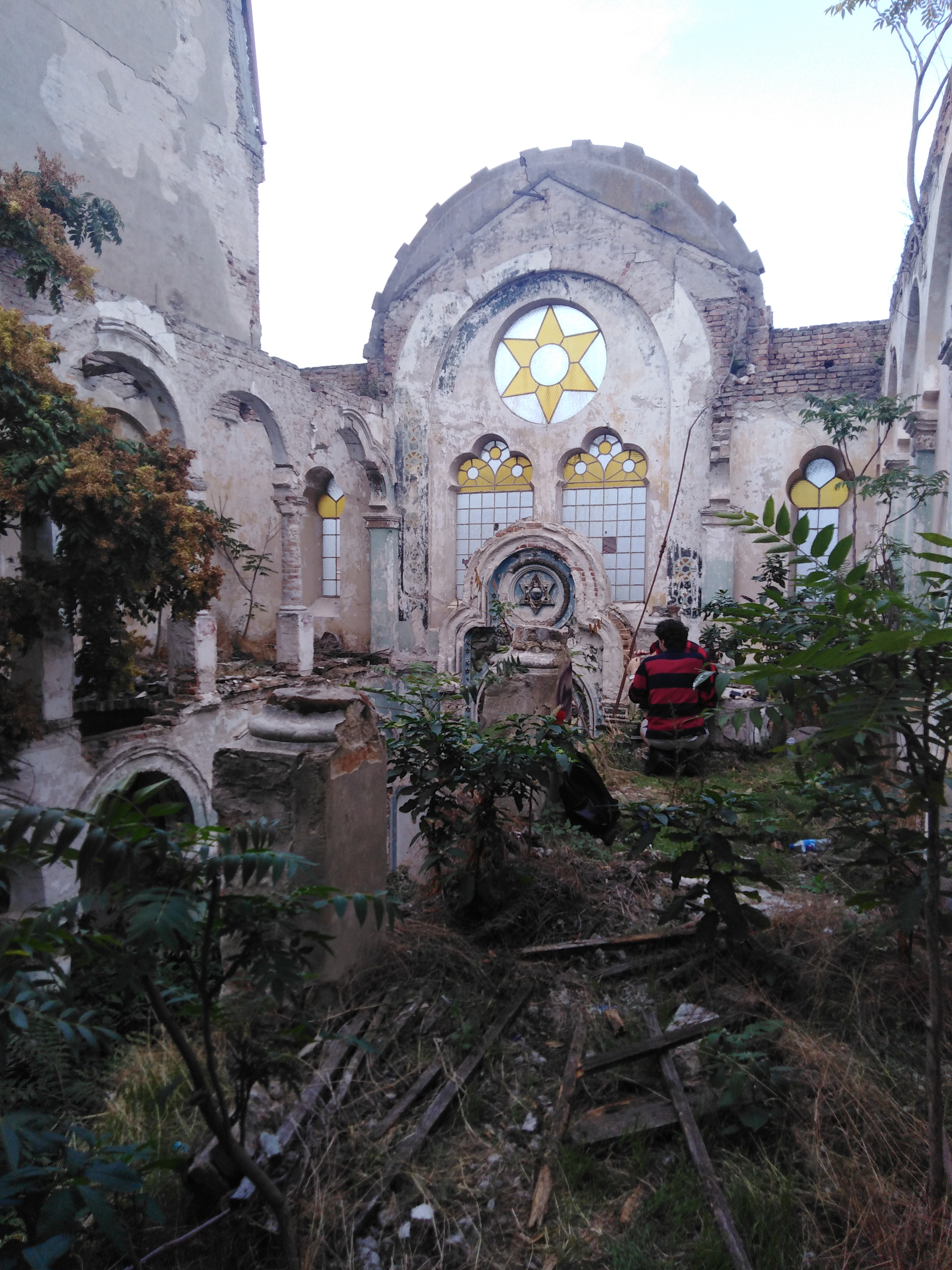

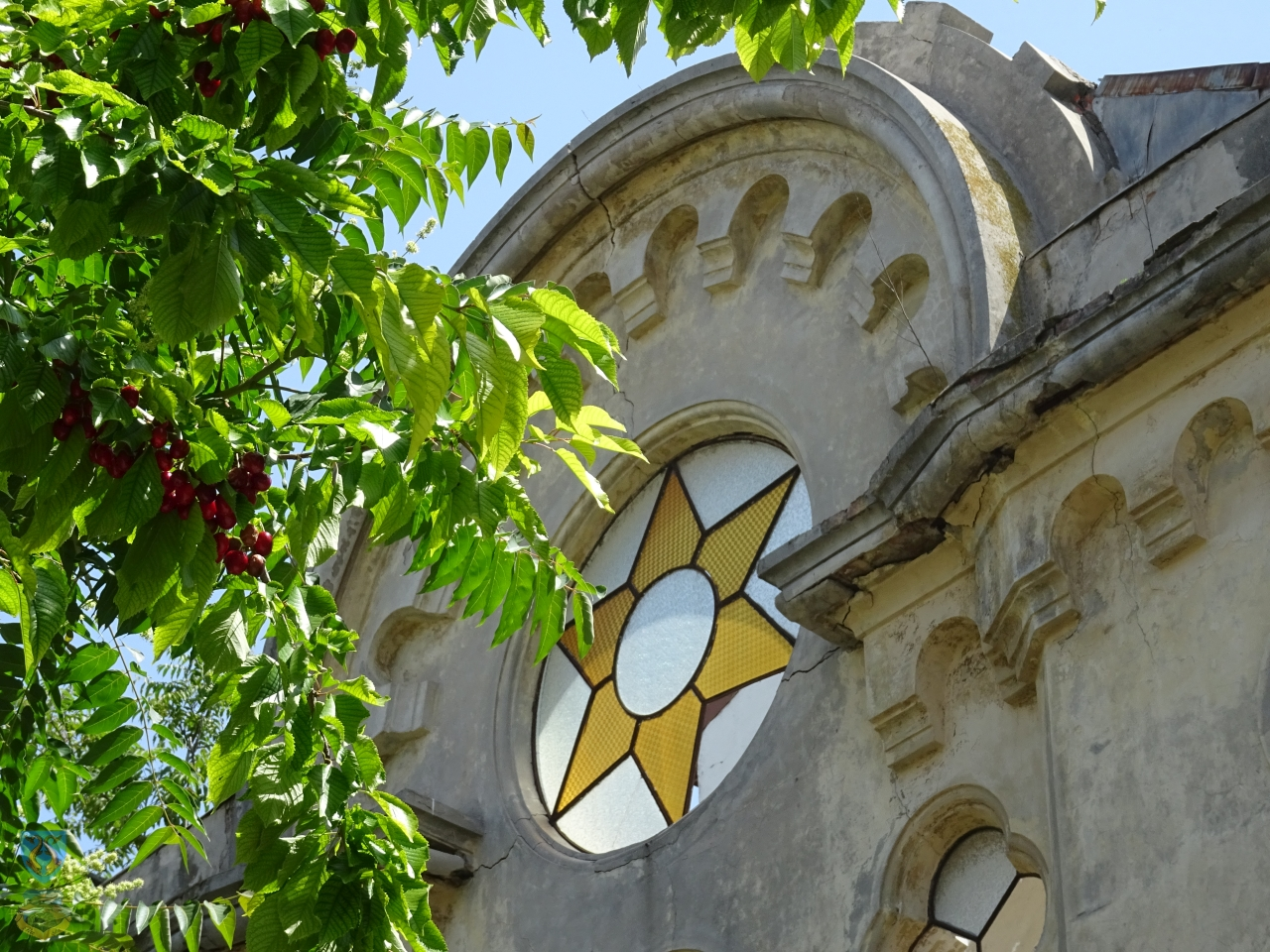

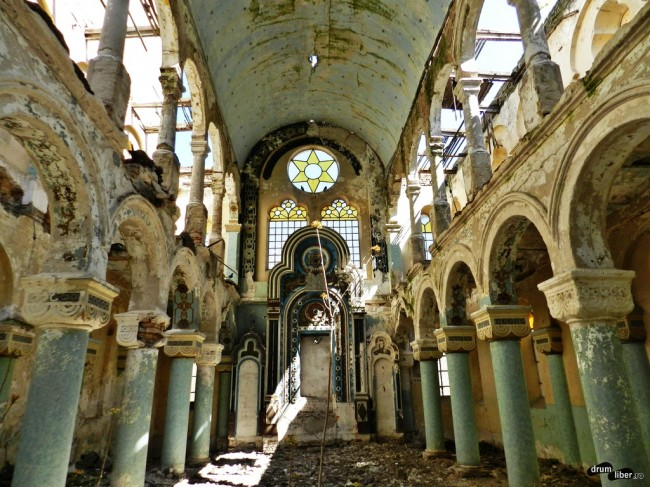

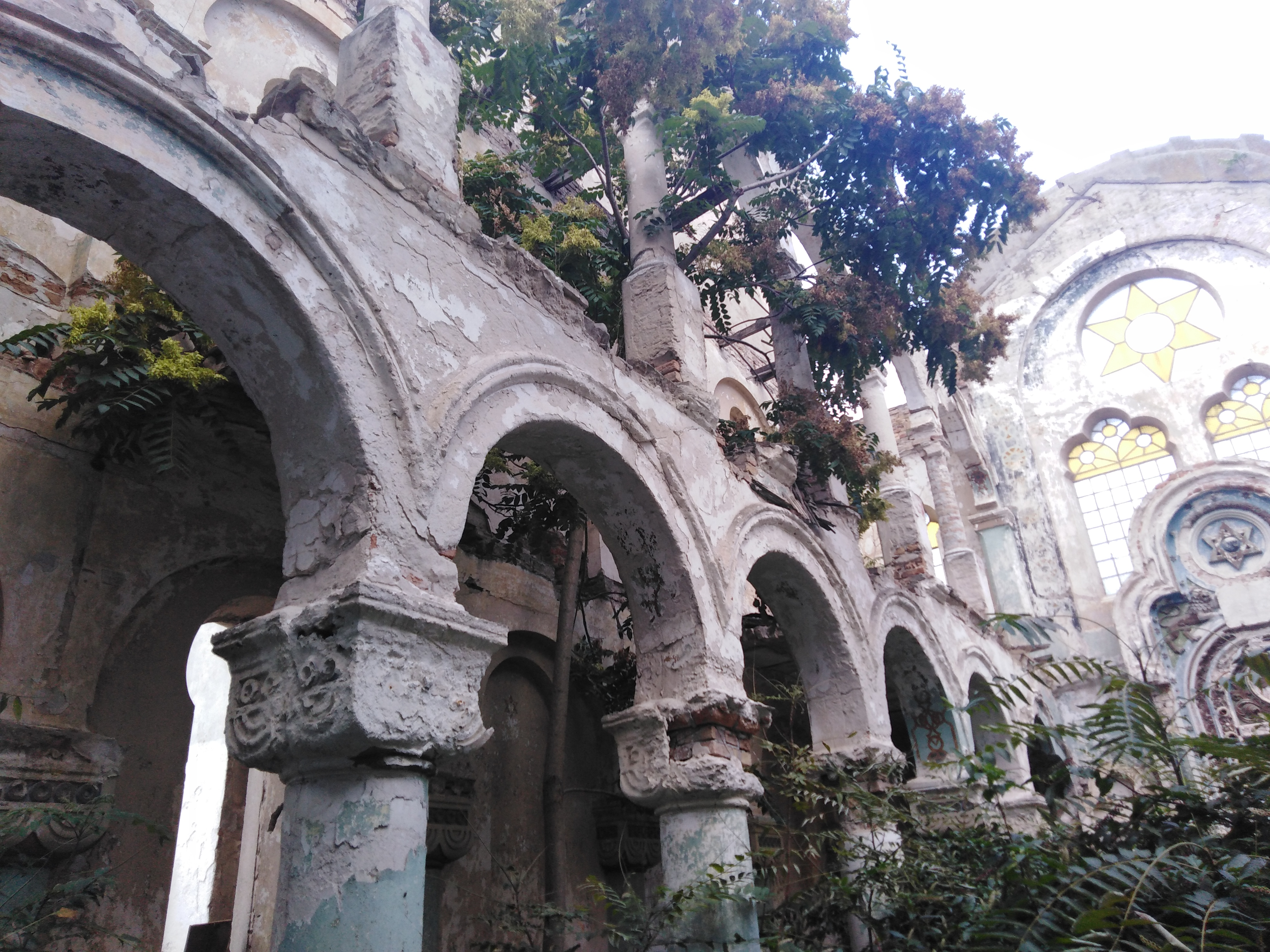

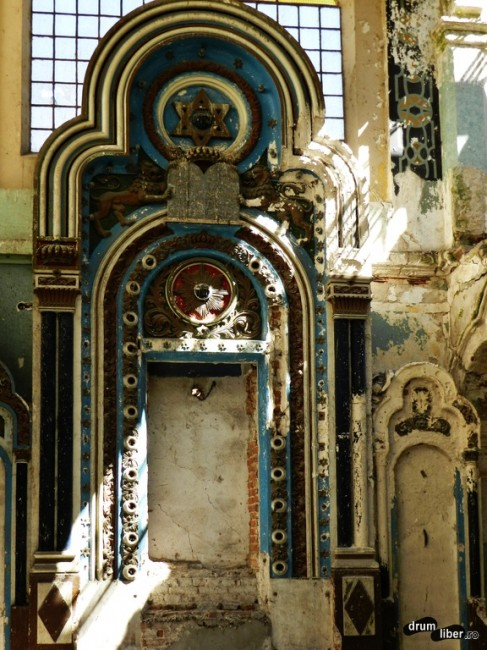

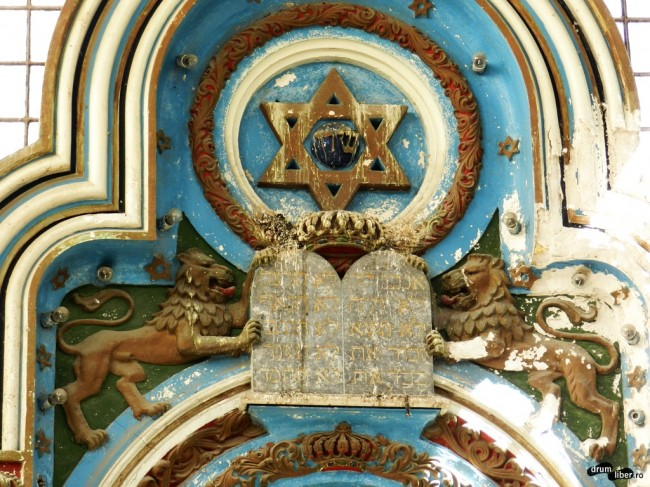

== See also ==
- History of the Jews in Romania
- List of synagogues in Romania
