= Craftsmen's Temple =

Craftsmen's Temple of Galați
- Templul Meseriașilor din Galați
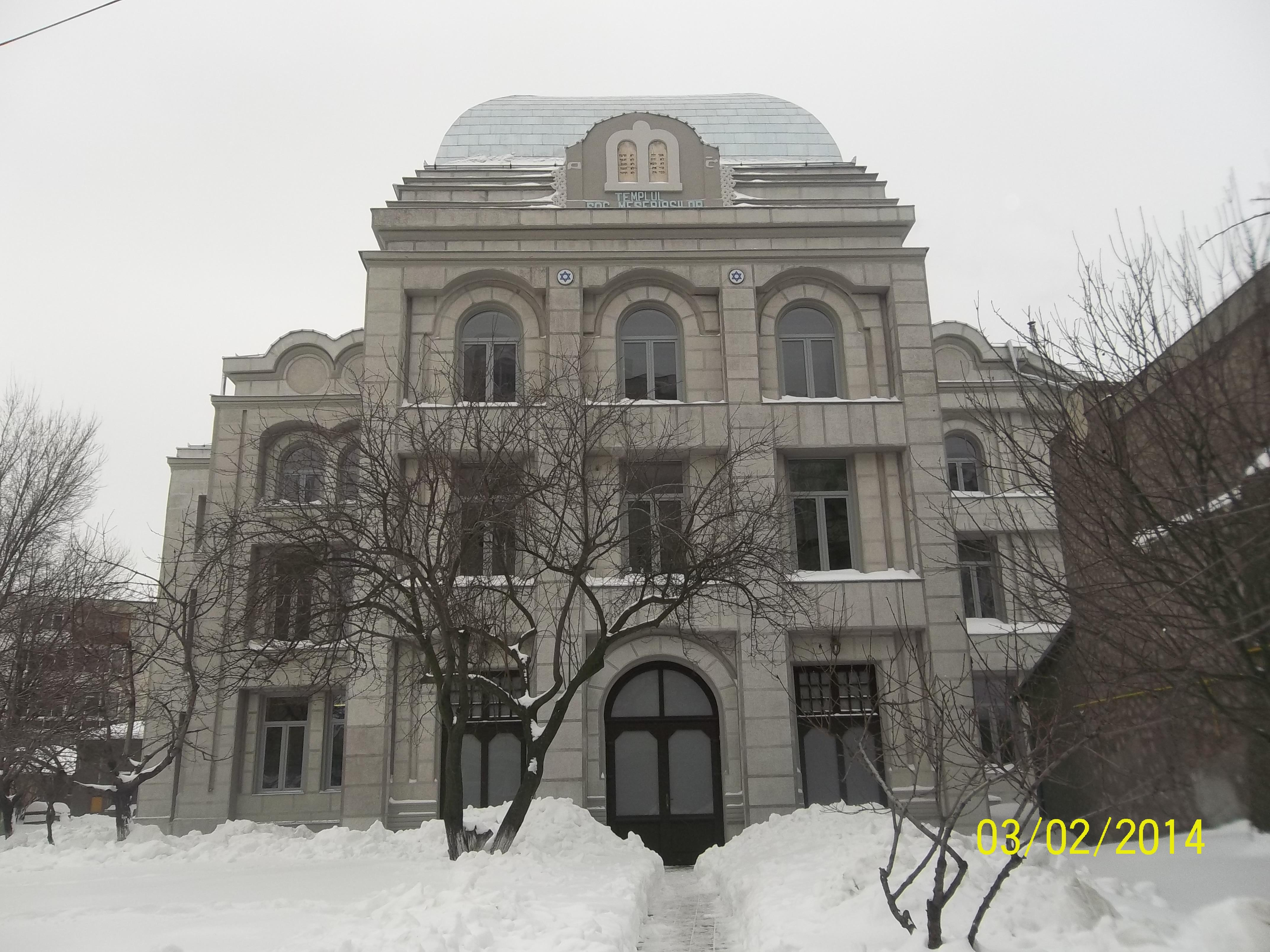
- The façade of the synagogue in 2014

Religion
- Affiliation: Judaism
- Ownership: Federation of the Jewish Communities in Romania
- Status: Active

Location
- Location: Dornei Street 7-11, Galați
- Interactive map of Craftsmen's Temple of Galați
- Coordinates: 45°26′10″N 28°03′06″E

Architecture
- Architects: Haim Kornberg; M. Șapira; Simon Kohn
- Type: Synagogue architecture
- Groundbreaking: 1892
- Completed: 1896
- Capacity: 250

The Craftsmen's Temple of Galați (Romanian: Templul Meseriașilor din Galați) or the Temple of the Society of Israeli Craftsmen (Romanian: Templul Societății meseriașilor israeliți) is a synagogue in Galați, Romania. It is the last remaining active Jewish place of worship in this city. It is located in a courtyard, on Dornei Street 7-11.

== History ==
On May 3 (the holiday of Lag BaOmer), the cornerstone was laid, and on May 9, construction began. On June 31, 1895, the cantor and choir were hired, and on August 11, 1896, the synagogue was officially opened in the presence of a large crowd. Part of the construction work was carried out by Jewish craftsmen on a voluntary basis.

Following the events of World War II, The Holocaust in Romania and the establishment of the communist regime, the Jewish population of Galați shrank through emigration to Israel. In the years 2004-2009 the synagogue fell into a state of decay.

It was renovated for 4 years and reopened in 2014.

== Gallery ==
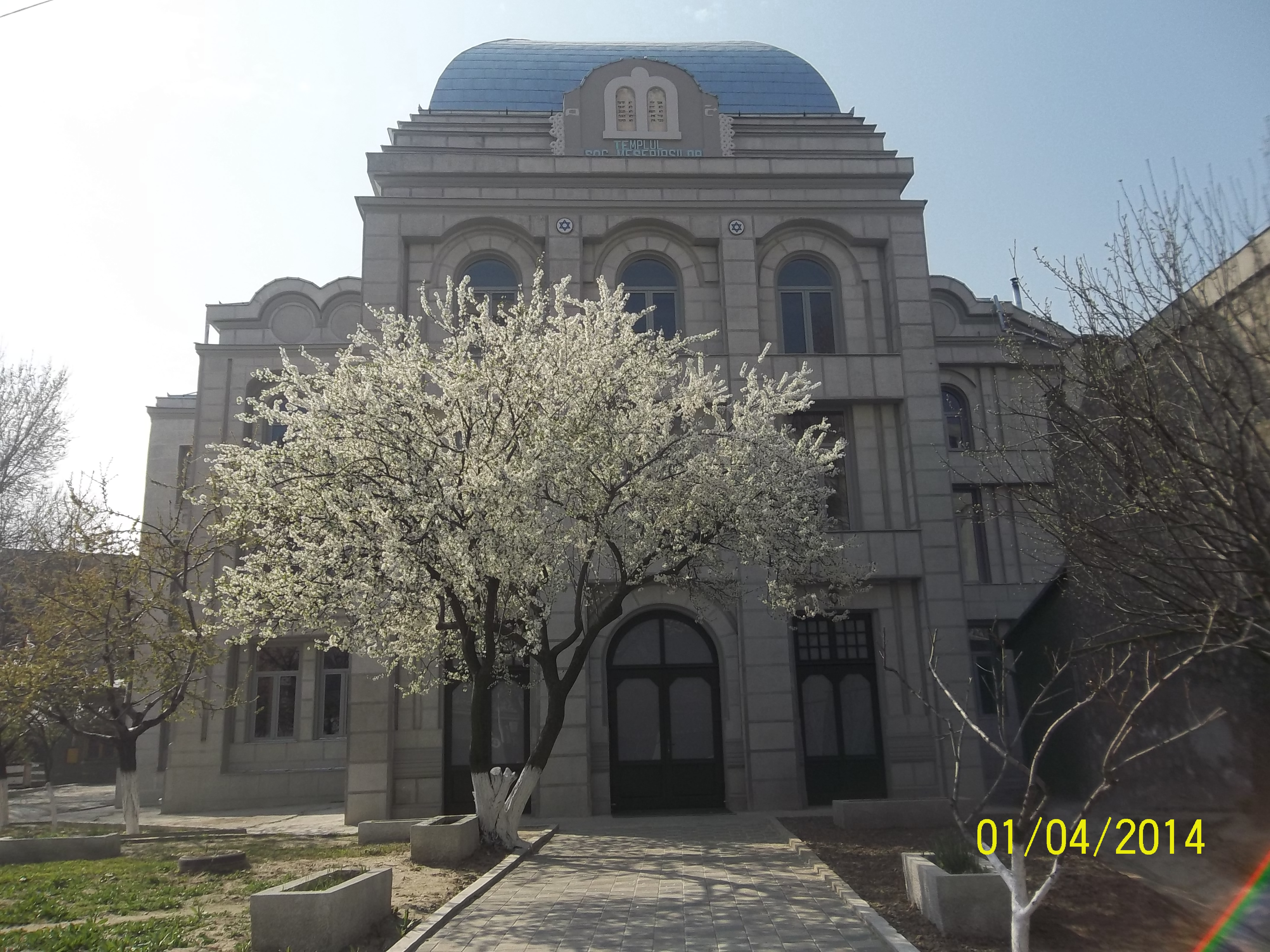
Facade of the synagogue

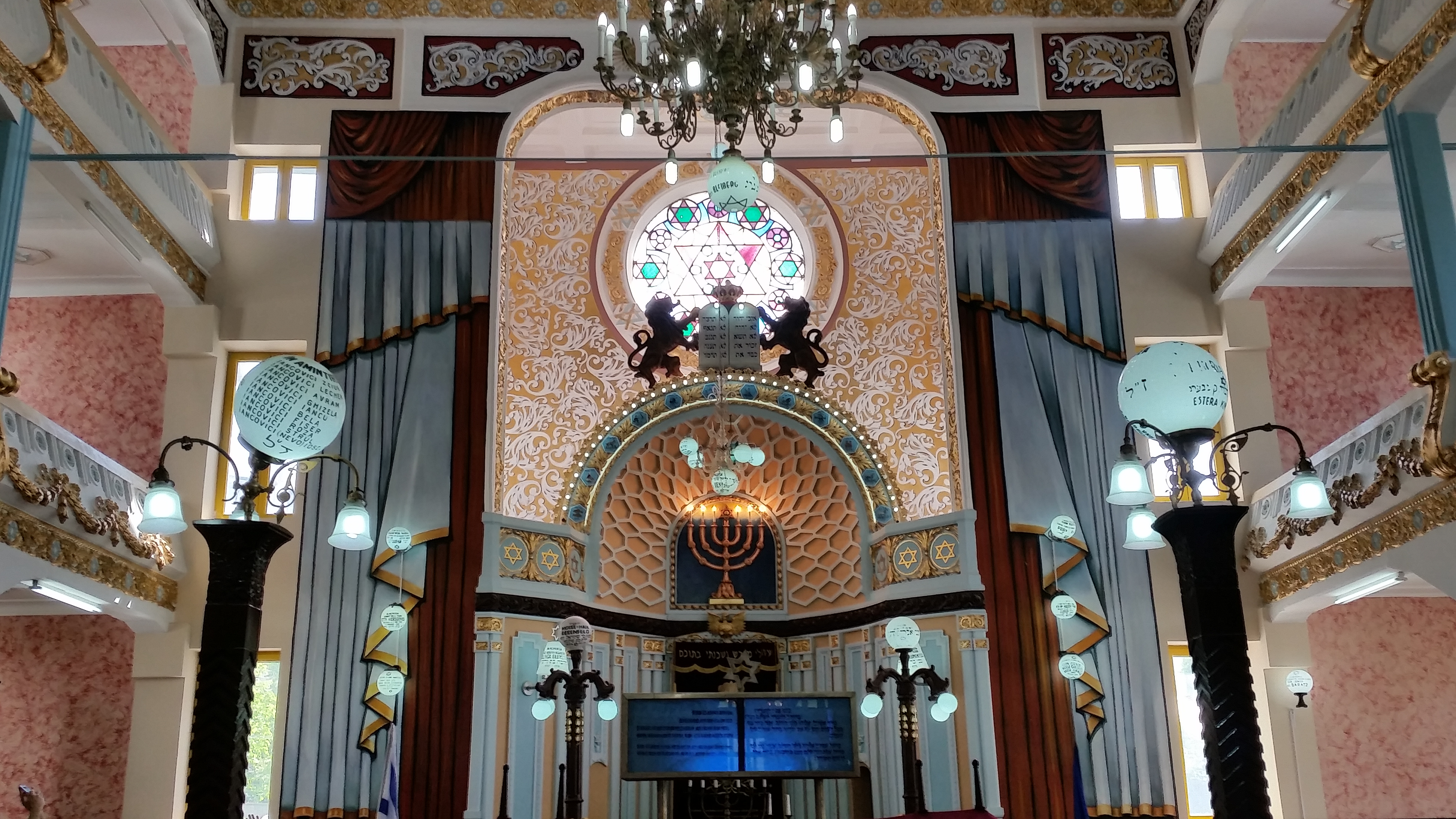
Altar of the synagogue

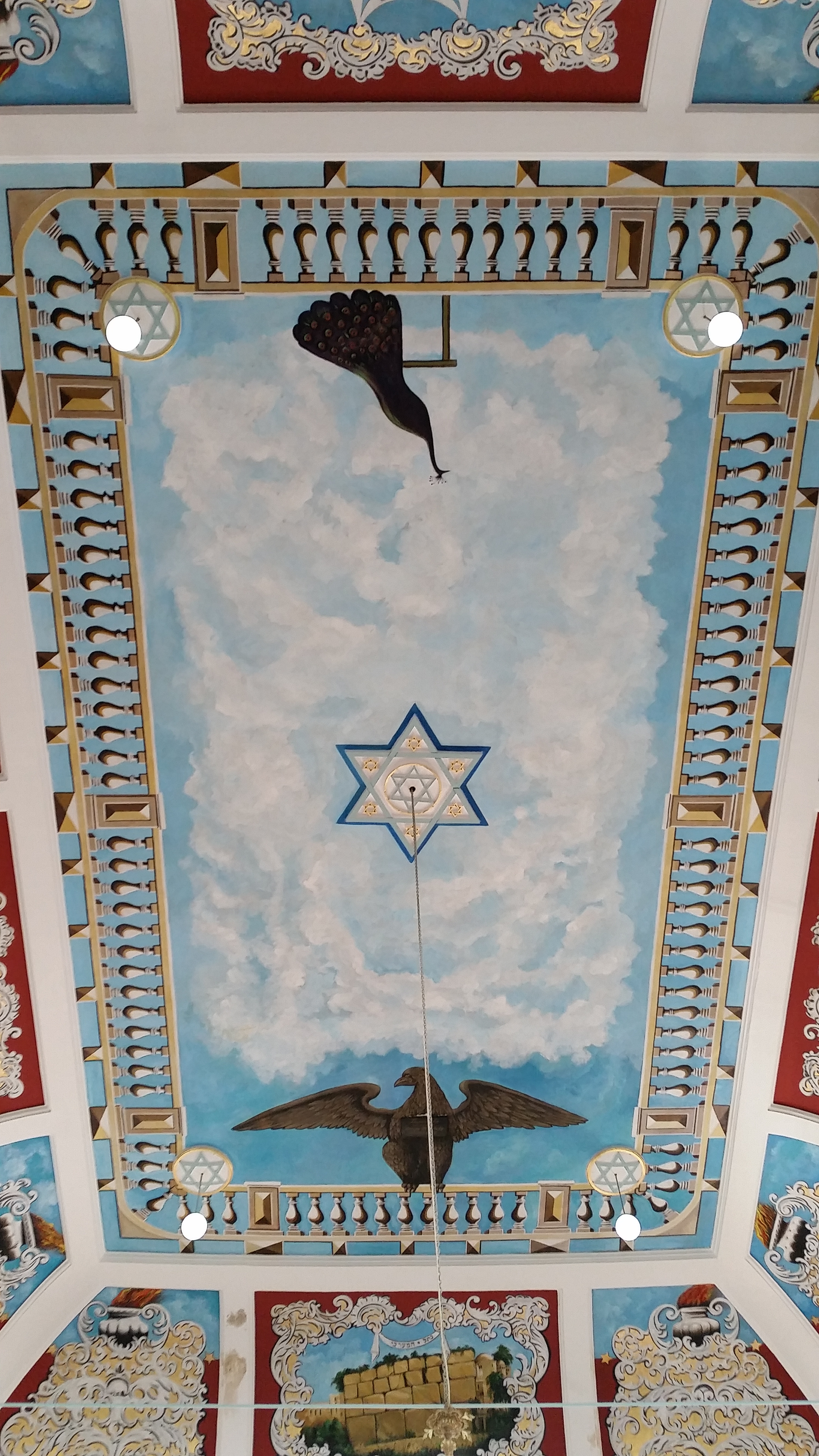
Synagogue ceiling

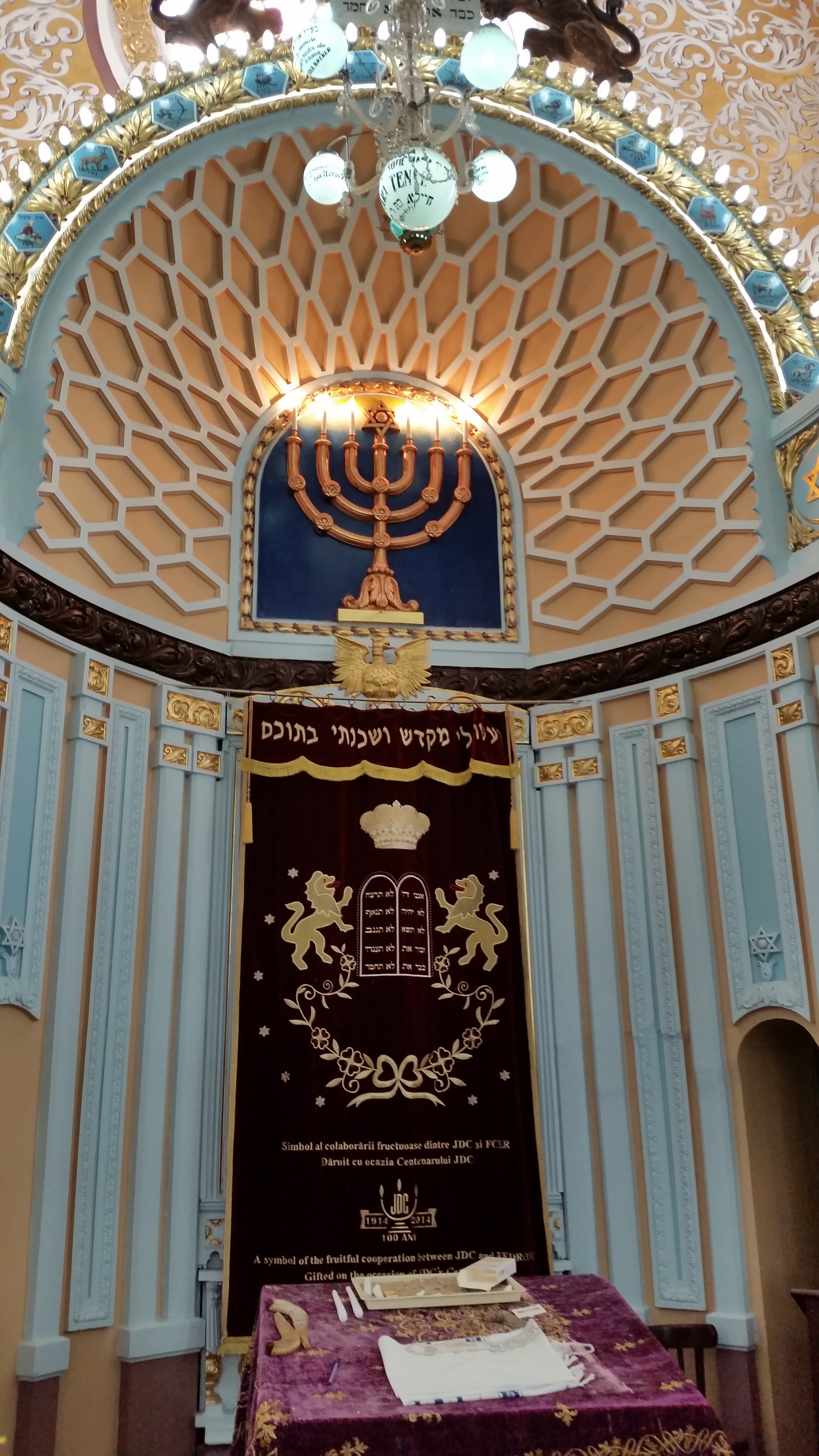
Holy ark

== See also ==
- History of the Jews in Romania
- List of synagogues in Romania
