= Silviu Vexler =

Romanian politician

- סילביו וקסלר

Member of the Chamber of Deputies
- Incumbent
- Assumed office 21 December 2016

Personal details
- Born: 8 December 1988 (age 37) Roman, Romania

Silviu Vexler (Hebrew: סילביו וקסלר; born 8 December 1988) is a Jewish-Romanian politician and member of the Chamber of Deputies. A representative of the local Jewish community, he has chaired various Jewish-Romanian organizations during his tenure. He assumed office on 21 December 2016.

== Biography ==
Silviu Vexler was born on 8 December 1988 in Roman, Romania. He graduated in 2010 from Hyperion University in Bucharest, with a degree in Journalism. He was a member of the Federation of the Jewish Communities in Romania and served as an advisor to MP Aurel Vainer.

He was elected to the Chamber of Deputies in the 2016 election as a candidate of the Federation of Jewish Communities in Romania, after Vainer announced his retirement. Vexler married actress Geni Brenda, from the State Jewish Theater, in September 2019.

== Political career ==
In 2025, he initiated amendments to the legislation on combating extremism (informally known as the "Vexler Law"), which toughened penalties for promoting fascism, legionarism, racism, and xenophobia. The bill sparked intense controversy because the law is vague about which organizations and materials can be considered "fascist," a point also raised by Romanian President Nicușor Dan.

Subsequently, scandals erupted in Parliament in December 2025, where debates included protests, mutual accusations, and an incident in which Vexler symbolically tore up a sheet of paper with photographs of important figures in Romanian history, a gesture considered controversial. The law was eventually adopted after challenges to the Constitutional Court and re-examination.
