= Iosefin Synagogue =

Orthodox synagogue in Timişoara, Romania

- Sinagoga din Iosefin
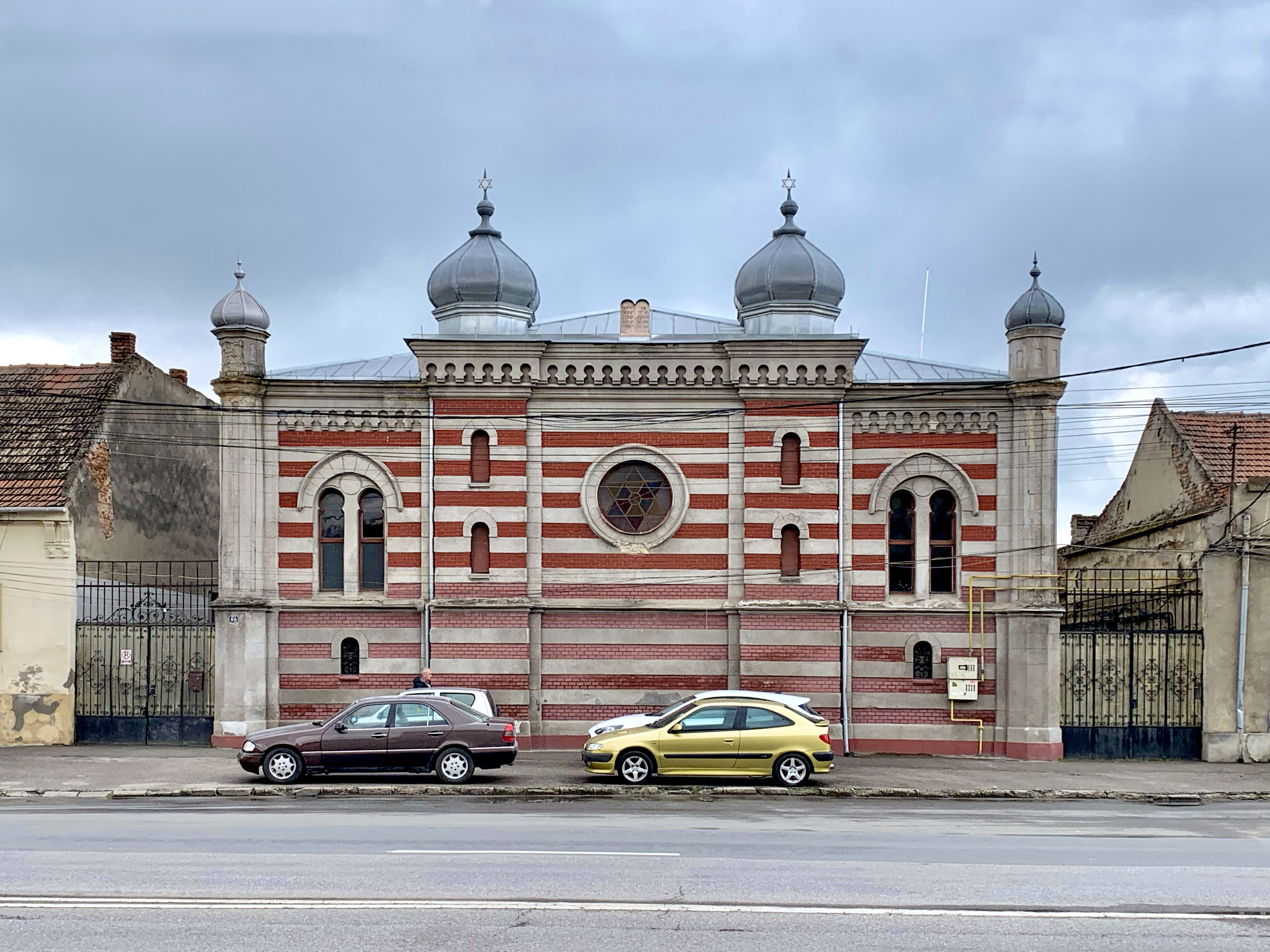
- The synagogue in 2023

Religion
- Affiliation: Orthodox Judaism
- Rite: Nusach Ashkenaz
- Ecclesiastical or organizational status: Synagogue
- Status: Active

Location
- Location: 55 Iuliu Maniu Boulevard, Iosefin, Timișoara
- Interactive map of Iosefin Synagogue
- Coordinates: 45°44′39″N 21°12′20″E

Architecture
- Architect: Karl Hart
- Type: Synagogue architecture
- Style: Eclectic; Moorish Revival; Romanesque Revival; Gothic Revival
- Established: 1871 (as a congregation)
- Completed: 1895

Specifications
- Capacity: 150
- Dome: 4
- Materials: Brick

The Iosefin Synagogue (Romanian: Sinagoga din Iosefin) is an Orthodox Jewish congregation and synagogue, located at 55 Iuliu Maniu Boulevard, in the Iosefin district of Timișoara, Romania. The synagogue was completed in 1895 in an eclectic architectural style, and it is one of the three large synagogues in the city, and the last still functioning.

== History ==
The community of Orthodox Jews in Iosefin, formed in 1871, met until 1894 in rented premises. The synagogue was inaugurated on 18 September 1895, on the eve of Rosh HaShanah. Rabbi Bernát Schück, as the leader of the community, made an effective contribution to its construction. Carol Telbisz, the mayor of Timișoara, was also present at its inauguration. Built according to the plans of the architect Karl Hart in an eclectic style with neo-Moorish, neo-Romanesque and neo-Gothic ornaments, the synagogue is modest in size compared to the other two large synagogues in the city. In 1910, the synagogue was enlarged, but photographs from 1914 and 1915 show that the synagogue had only one central dome. Later it acquired its current appearance, with two central domes and two smaller, lateral ones.

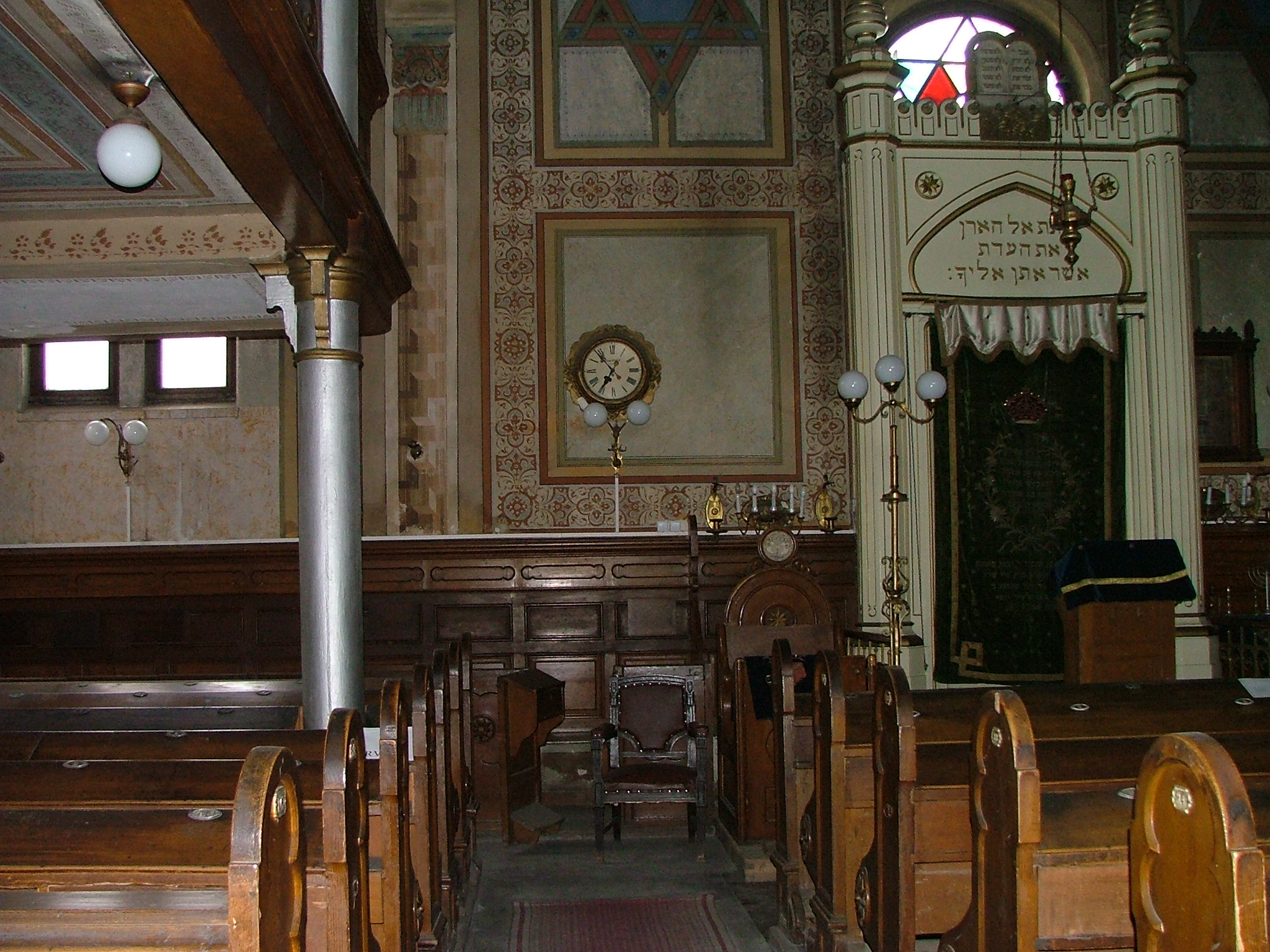
Interior of the synagogue

In the courtyard of the synagogue there were a cheder (kindergarten), a mikveh (ritual bath) and a shechita slaughterhouse. The Orthodox primary school, established in 1918, moved ten years later to a new building at the end of the courtyard. The marble plaque inside the synagogue commemorates the construction of the school in 1928, honoring the names of those who contributed: First Rabbi Bernát Schück, Community President Jakab Rothbart, architects Arnold Merbl and Jakab Klein and others.

At present, the Iosefin Synagogue is used on Friday evenings, Saturday mornings and High Holidays.

== Architecture ==
The temple is articulated on two levels and is characterized by a pronounced horizontal development rather than vertical emphasis, distinguishing it from the synagogues in Fabric and Cetate. The synagogue in Iosefin features a substantial yet relatively low ground floor, surmounted by an upper level distinguished by windows of varying shapes and dimensions.

== See also ==
- History of the Jews in Romania
- List of synagogues in Romania
