= Cluj-Napoca Neolog Synagogue =

Neolog synagogue in Cluj-Napoca, Romania

Neolog Synagogue in Cluj-Napoca (Temple of the Deportees)
- Romanian: Sinagoga Neologă din Cluj-Napoca
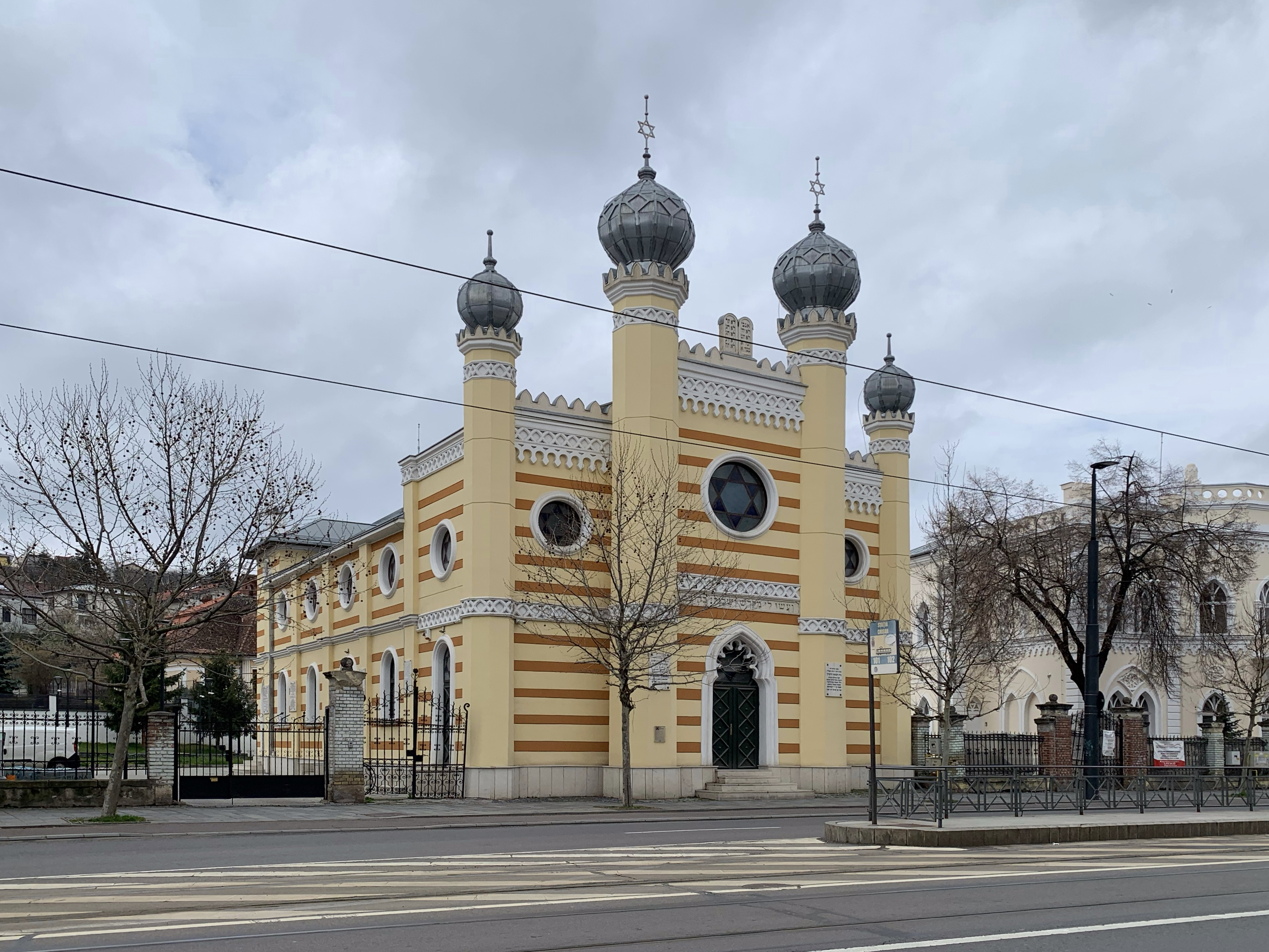
- The synagogue, in 2023

- Location of the synagogue in Cluj County

Religion
- Affiliation: Neolog Judaism
- Rite: Nusach Ashkenaz
- Ecclesiastical or organizational status: Synagogue; Profane use (during WWII)
- Status: Active

Location
- Location: 21 Horea Street, Cluj-Napoca, Cluj County, Transylvania
- Country: Romania
- Interactive map of Neolog Synagogue in Cluj-Napoca (Temple of the Deportees)
- Coordinates: 46°46′38″N 23°35′13″E

Architecture
- Architect: Izidor Hegner
- Type: Synagogue architecture
- Style: Moorish Revival
- Established: 1849 (as a congregation)
- Groundbreaking: 1886
- Completed: 1887
- Demolished: Partially in 1927, 1944

Specifications
- Dome: Four (maybe more)
- Materials: Brick

The Neolog Synagogue in Cluj-Napoca (Romanian: Sinagoga Neologă din Cluj-Napoca); also known as the Temple of the Deportees (Templul Memorial al Deportaţilor; Hungarian: Kolozsvári Neológ Zsinagóga, Emléktemplom), dedicated to the memory of those deported who were victims of the Holocaust; or more simply, the Neolog Synagogue (Romanian: Sinagoga Neologă), is a Neolog Jewish congregation and synagogue, located at 21 Horea Street, in the city of Cluj-Napoca, in Cluj County, in Transylvania, Romania.

Designed by Izidor Hegner in the Moorish Revival style, the synagogue was completed in 1887.

== History ==
Located on Horea Street, it was built based on the plans of Izidor Hegner, an engineer, between 1886 and 1887. Seriously affected after attacks by the Iron Guard on September 13, 1927, it was soon rebuilt by the Romanian government.

In the period following the Second Vienna Award, when Northern Transylvania was returned to Hungary, it witnessed the Jews' deportation to Nazi extermination camps, Auschwitz-Birkenau, and was damaged by the bombardments of the neighbouring railway station, on June 2, 1944. In 1951 it was again restored, and the synagogue rededicated in memory of the lives of the Jews who were deported during the Holocaust.

In 2018, further restoration of the synagogue commenced including the development of a Jewish social cultural center.

== See also ==
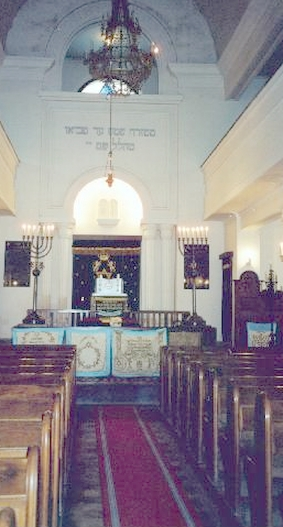
Interior view

- History of the Jews in Romania
- List of synagogues in Romania
