= Brașov Synagogue =

Neolog synagogue in Brașov, Romania

Brașov Synagogue (Beth Israel Synagogue of Brașov)
- Romanian: Sinagoga Beit Israel Brașov
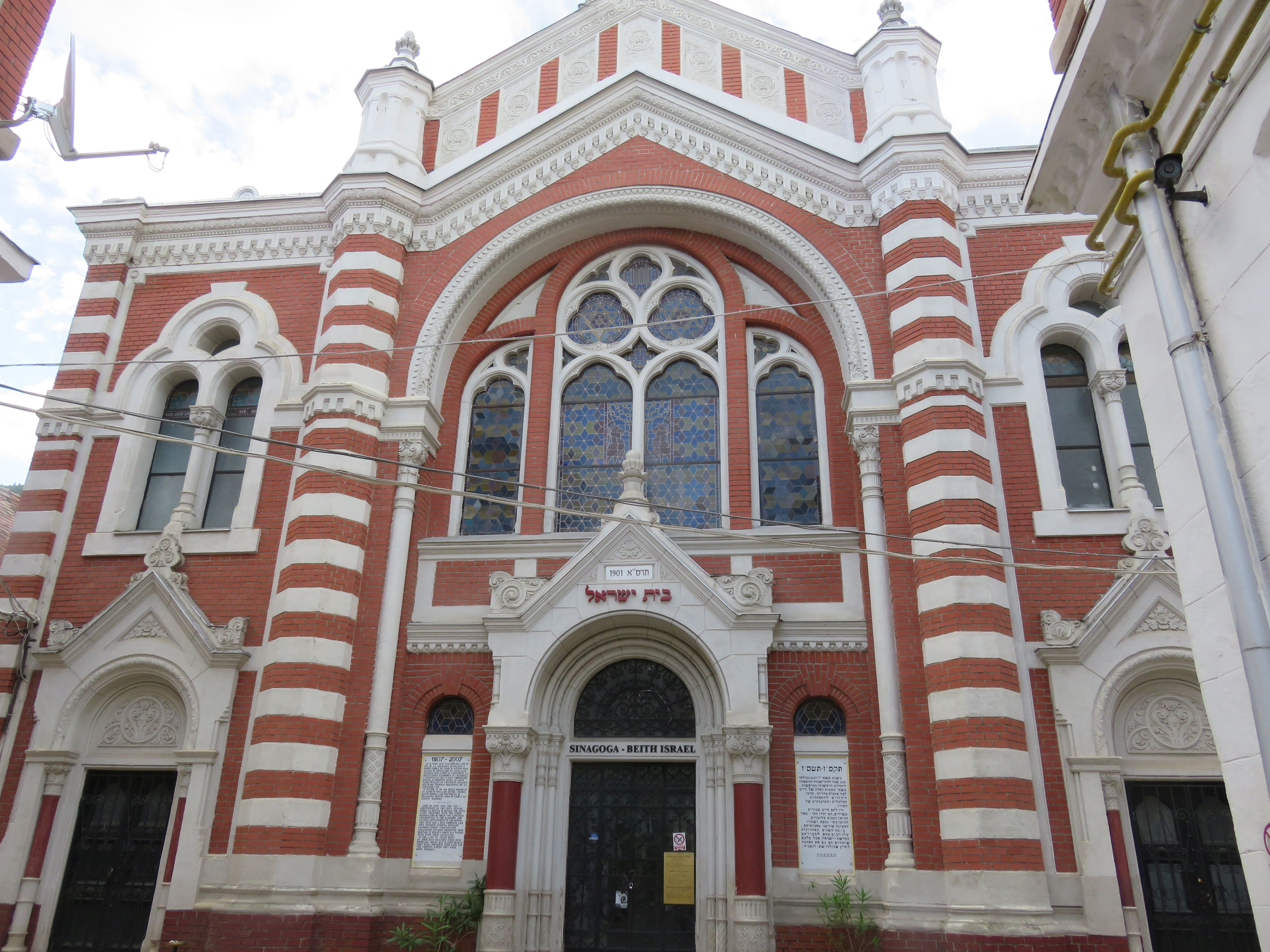
- The synagogue façade, in 2018

- Location of the synagogue in Brașov

Religion
- Affiliation: Neolog Judaism
- Rite: Nusach Ashkenaz
- Ecclesiastical or organizational status: Synagogue; Profane use (during WWII)
- Status: Active

Location
- Location: 29 Poarta Șchei Street, Brașov, Transylvania
- Country: Romania
- Interactive map of Brașov Synagogue (Beth Israel Synagogue of Brașov)
- Coordinates: 45°38′21″N 25°35′17″E

Architecture
- Architect: Lipót Baumhorn
- Type: Synagogue architecture
- Style: Hungarian Secession; Gothic Revival; Moorish Revival
- Established: 1868 (as a congregation)
- Groundbreaking: 1898
- Completed: 1901; 2007 (restoration)
- Construction cost: 1.2 million Austro-Hungarian crowns

Specifications
- Interior area: 657 square metres (7,000 sq ft)
- Materials: Brick

Monument istoric
- Official name: Brașov: Sinagoga neologă
- Type: Monumente de arhitectură
- Designated: sec. XIX
- Reference no.: BV-II-m-B-11515

The Brașov Synagogue, officially the Beth Israel Synagogue in Brașov (Romanian: Sinagoga Beit Israel Brașov; Hebrew: בית ישראל, lit. 'House of Israel Synagogue in Brașov') is a former Neolog, currently Orthodox Jewish congregation and synagogue, located at 29 Poarta Șchei Street in the center of Brașov, in Transylvania, Romania. Designed by Lipót Baumhorn in the Hungarian Secession style, the synagogue was completed in 1901, and is situated behind the street front, on a plot surrounded by houses. The synagogue plays a ritual role and the building complex includes a community seat and a kosher restaurant.

The synagogue is included on the National Register of Historic Monuments in Romania.

== History ==
Although practitioners of Judaism had lived in Brașov as early as the 15th century, they did not receive an official settlement permit until 1807. The Brașov Jewish community, which initially comprised four families, was formed in 1826. They initially used the Chapel Street Hospital, established by Saxon Lutherans, as a religious building. The prayer house relocated to the Lakatos-Zwinger area (where the museum is today), and a school was established. From 1856, the community's house of worship was in the Joiner-Zwinger, at the site of the later reformed church (where the Aro Palace stands today).

Brașov was the first Saxon city in which Jewish merchants also played a role: They wrote a petition which later allowed Jews to settle in other cities in Transylvania.

Established as an Orthodox congregation, after 1868 the community affiliated with Neologicism. In 1877, it split into an innovative Neologist faction led by Aronsohn Löbl and a nationalist Orthodox group led by Adler Bernhard. Each community built its own prayer house. The Neolog Synagogue was built between 1898 and 1901, at 29 Orphanage Street, according to the plans of architect Lipót Baumhorn. It cost 1.2 million crowns to build, more than the magnificent Szeged Synagogue. Rabbi Ludovic Pap-Rosenberg inaugurated the synagogue on August 20, 1901. Hundreds of soldiers were deployed to maintain order during the ceremony because of the blood blazing charge.

During the first four decades of the 20th century, the city's Jewish community more than quadrupled to 3,494. In 1912, an organization was set up to envision the future of Jewry in Argentina. In 1921, a Jewish sports association was founded under the name Ivria, and soon another was founded under the name Hakoach.

In November 1940, Iron Guards damaged the synagogue, smashing the stained glass, furniture, and organ. During World War II, the building was used as a gym. After the war, it was renovated, and in 1949 the Neologist and Orthodox factions reunited. After the establishment of the State of Israel, the majority of the Jews in Brasov emigrated.

In 2001, on the centenary of its opening, the synagogue was renovated again. Because the community had become more Orthodox, the bane was moved to the center of the main ship by moving the benches and cutting them back. In August 2014, a monument was unveiled in the courtyard to commemorate the Transylvanian victims of the Holocaust. In October 2014, the synagogue was renamed Beth Israel (House of Israel). The community currently has approximately 225 members and the cemetery is on Crișan Street.

== Description ==
The 657-square-metre (7,000 sq ft) synagogue is built in a three-nave Gothic Revival style with Moorish Revival elements. Stained-glass windows show the coat of arms of 32 Israeli settlements. The facade's windows emit sunlight, and the top of the roof represents the stone tablet of the Ten Commandments. Memorial plaques in the lobby list the names of the presidents of the Jewish community and the Jews from Brasov who died during World War II. The main nave is separated by rows of columns from the aisles; these pillars have balconies where women can sit. The synagogue is open Monday through Friday; an entrance fee is required.

The building complex, at 27 Orava House, includes a community headquarters, kosher restaurant, medical office, and aid organization.

== Gallery ==
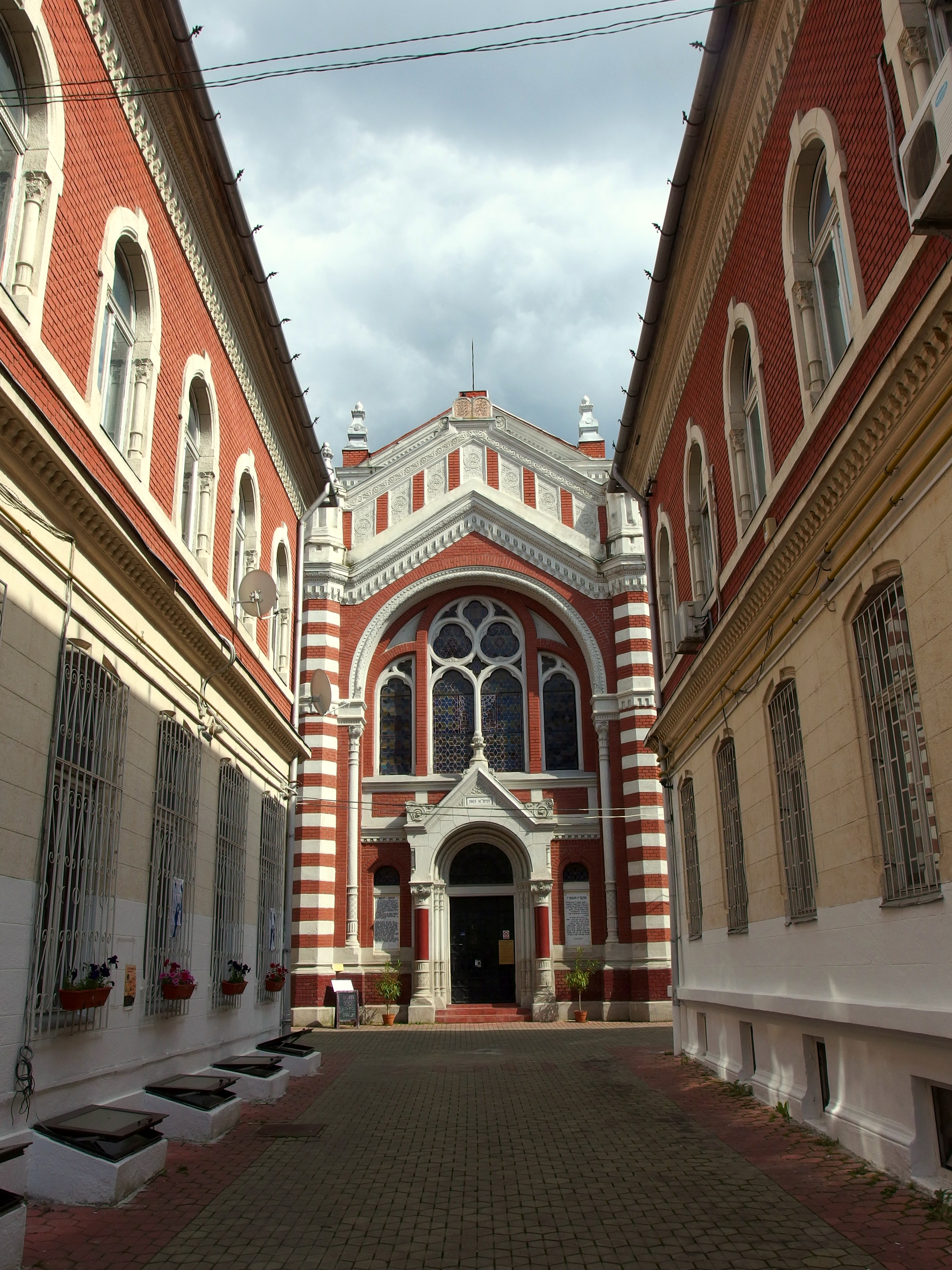

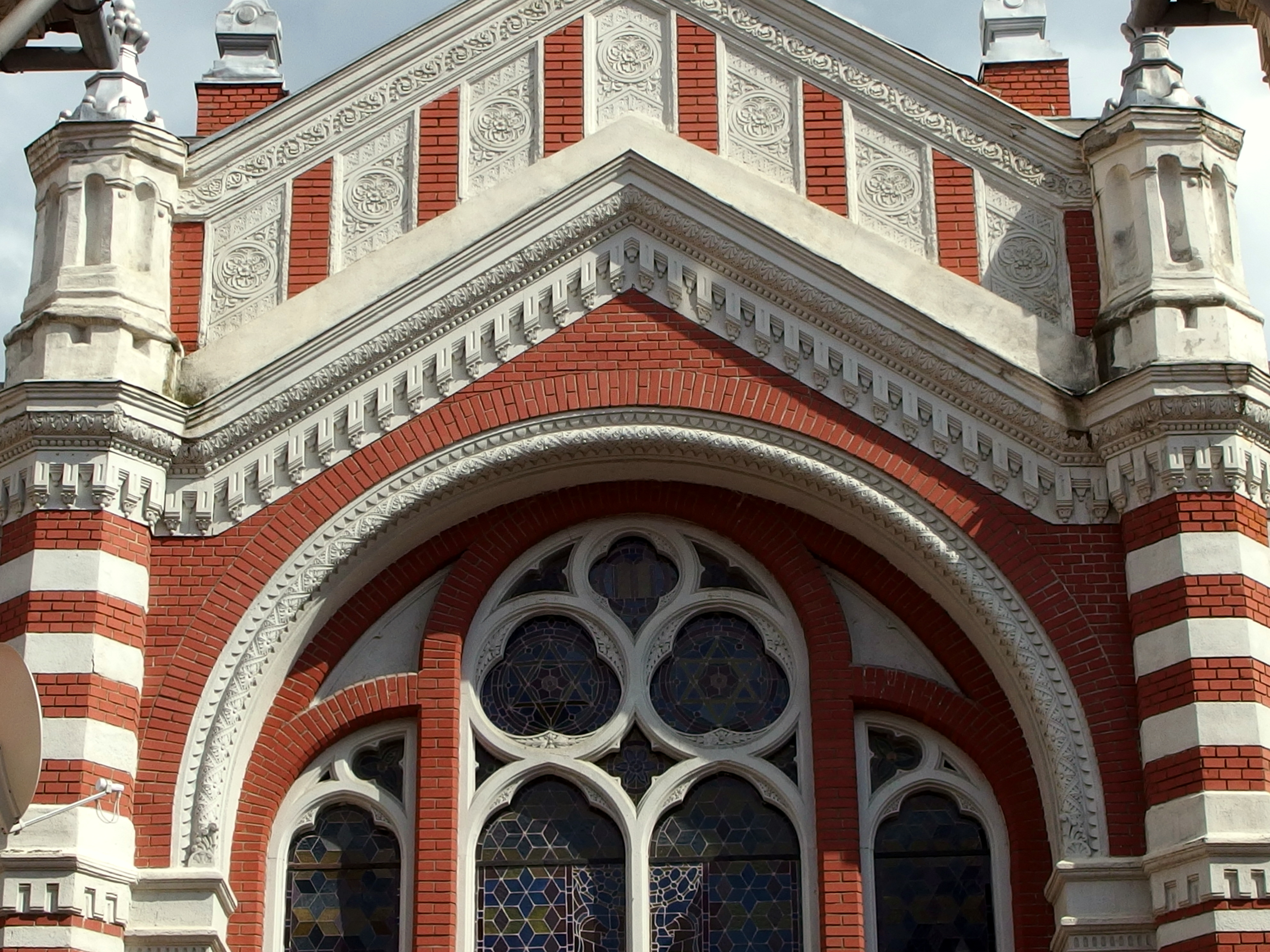

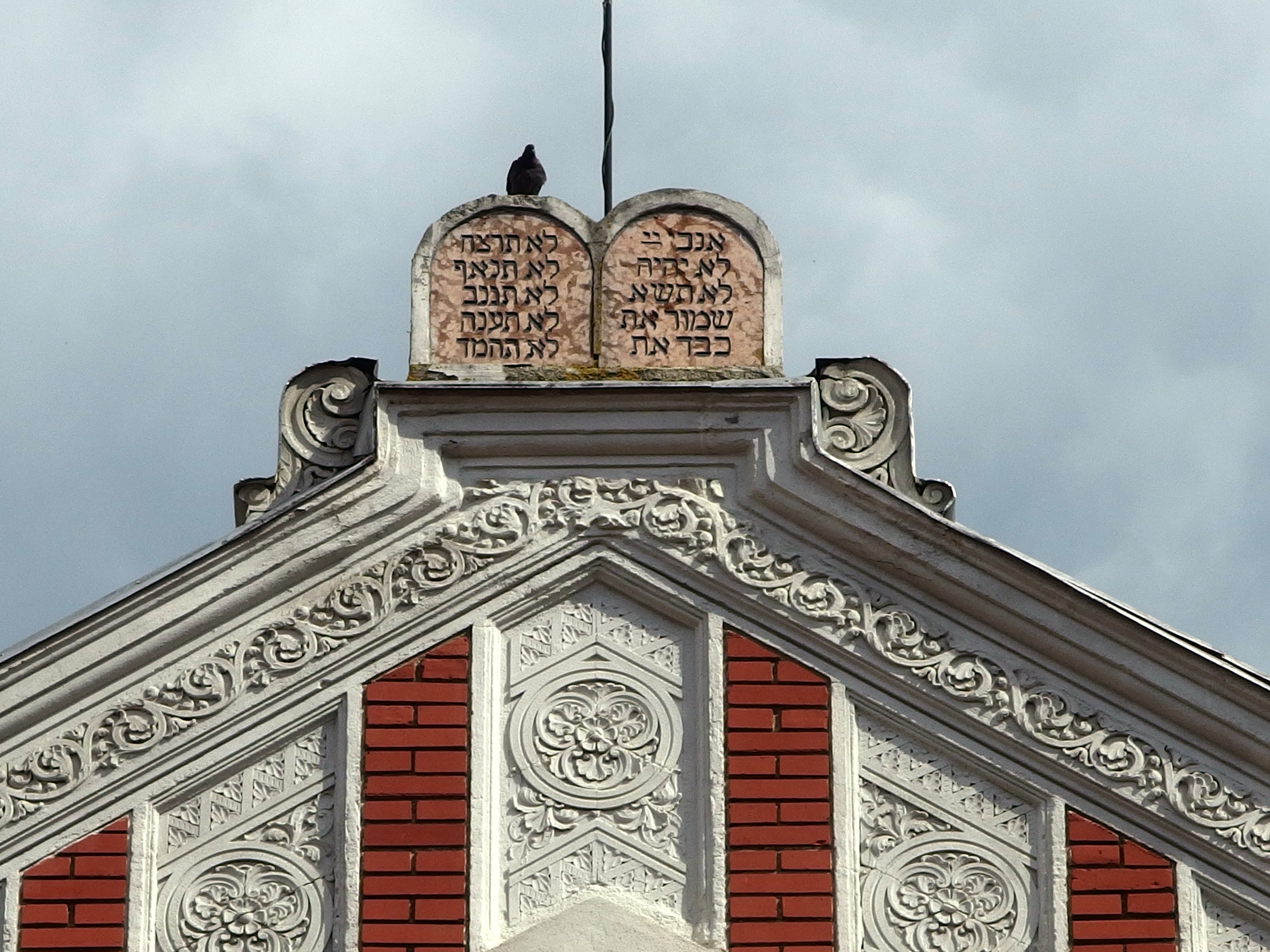

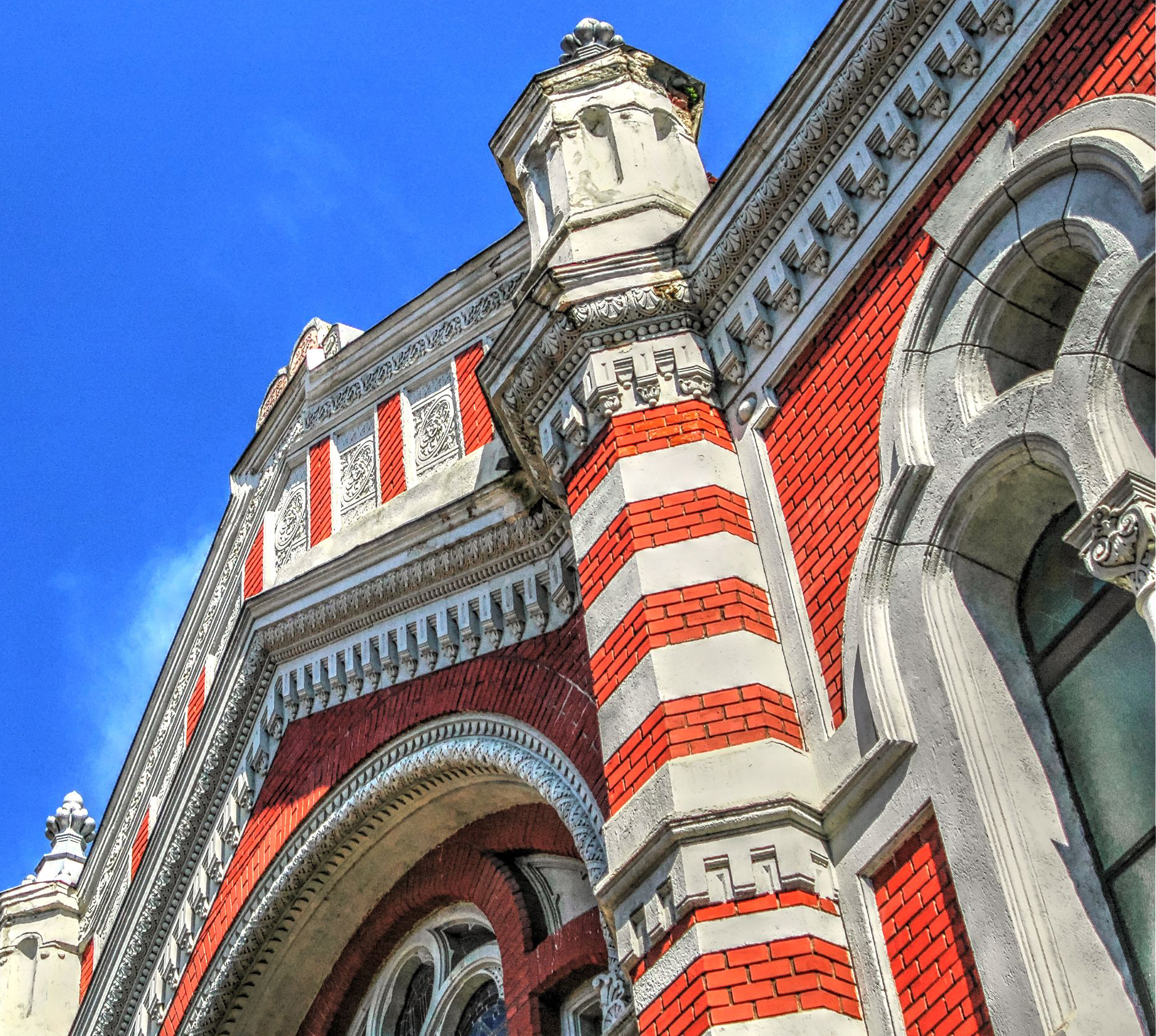

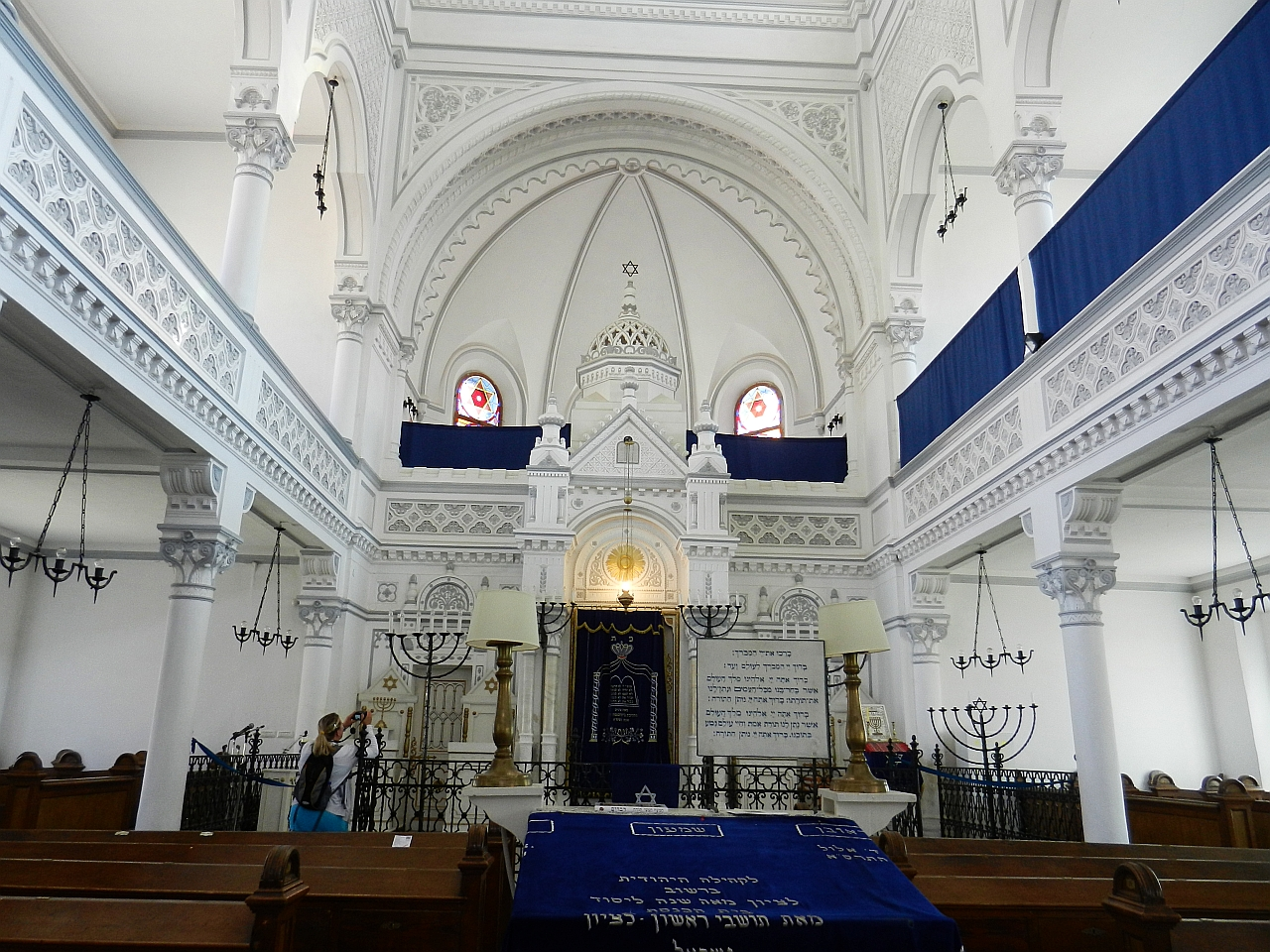

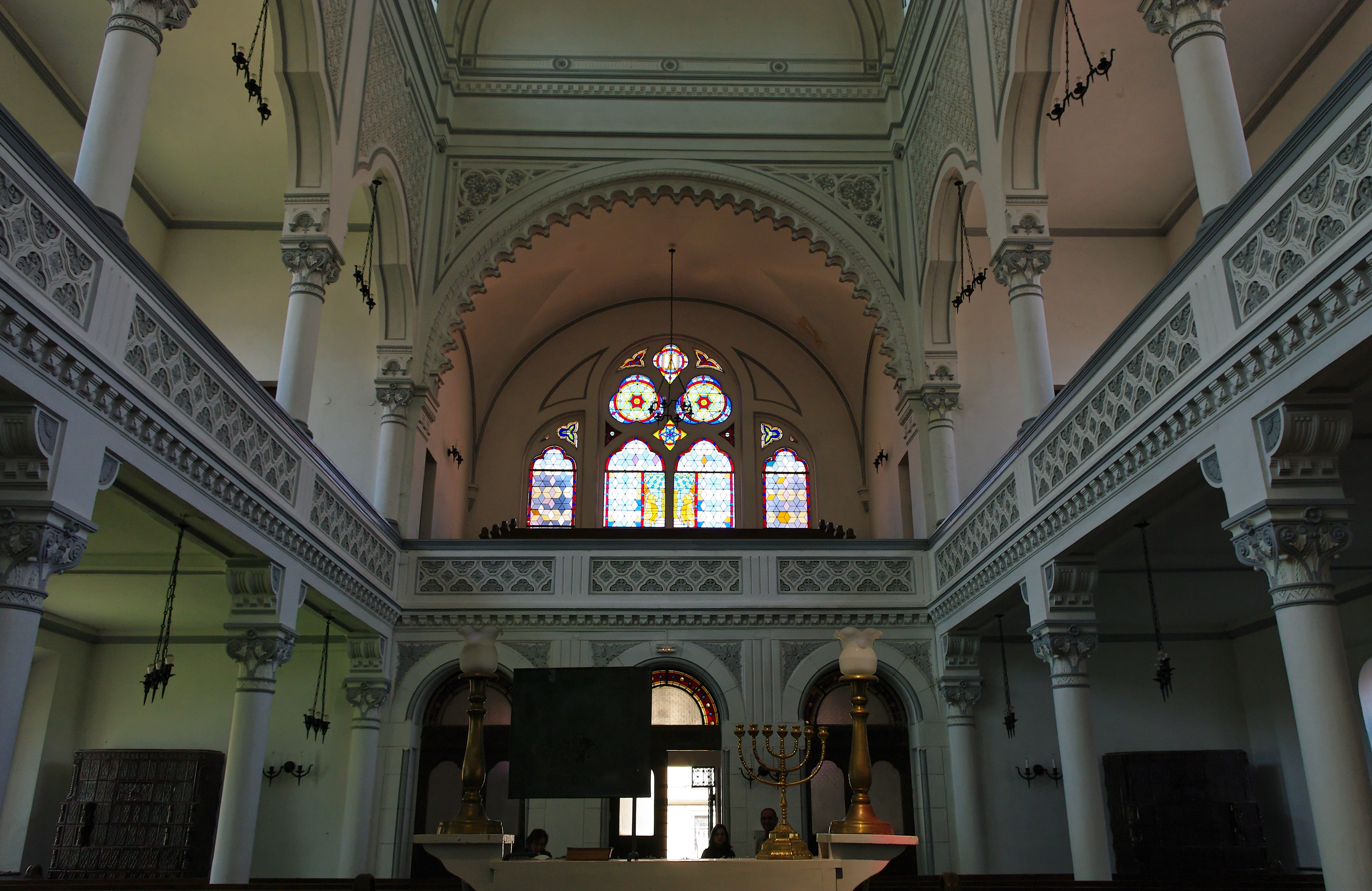

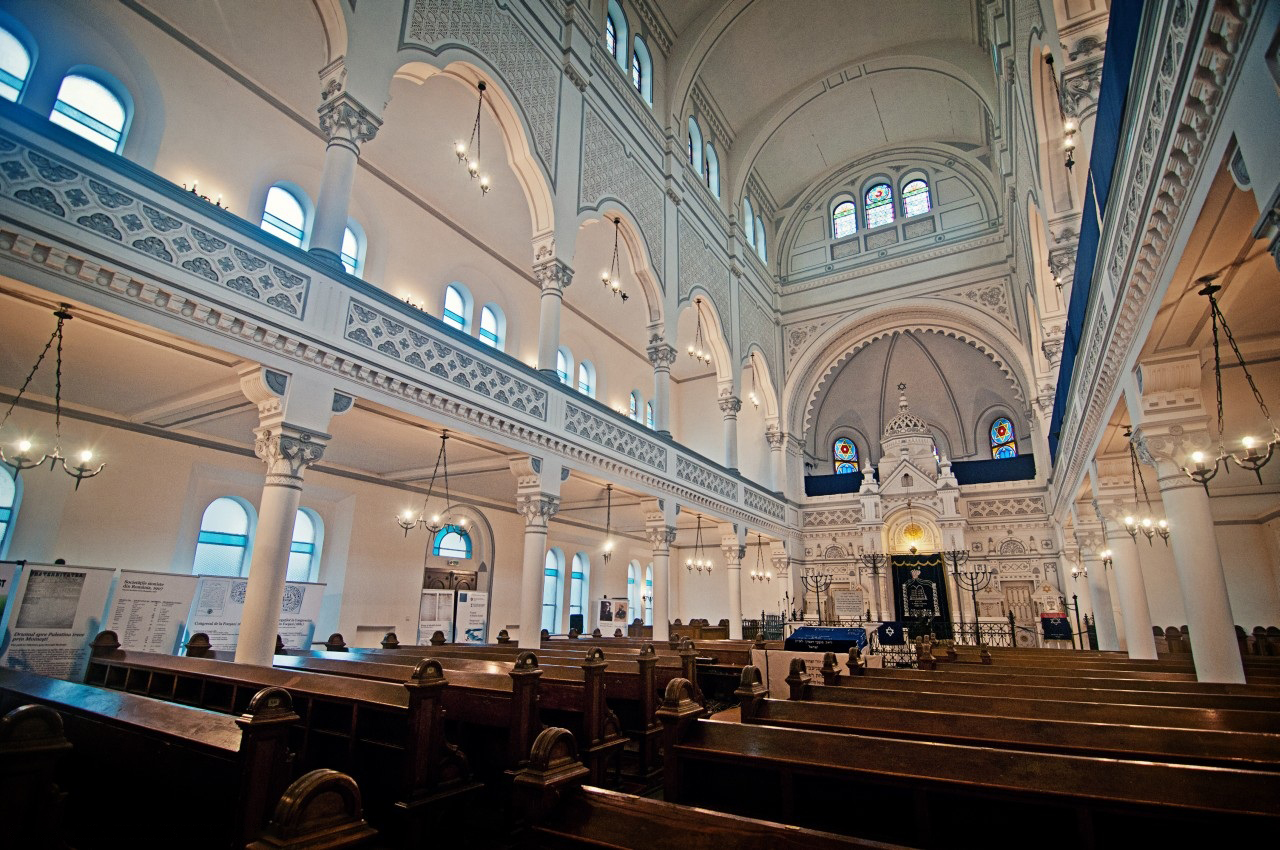

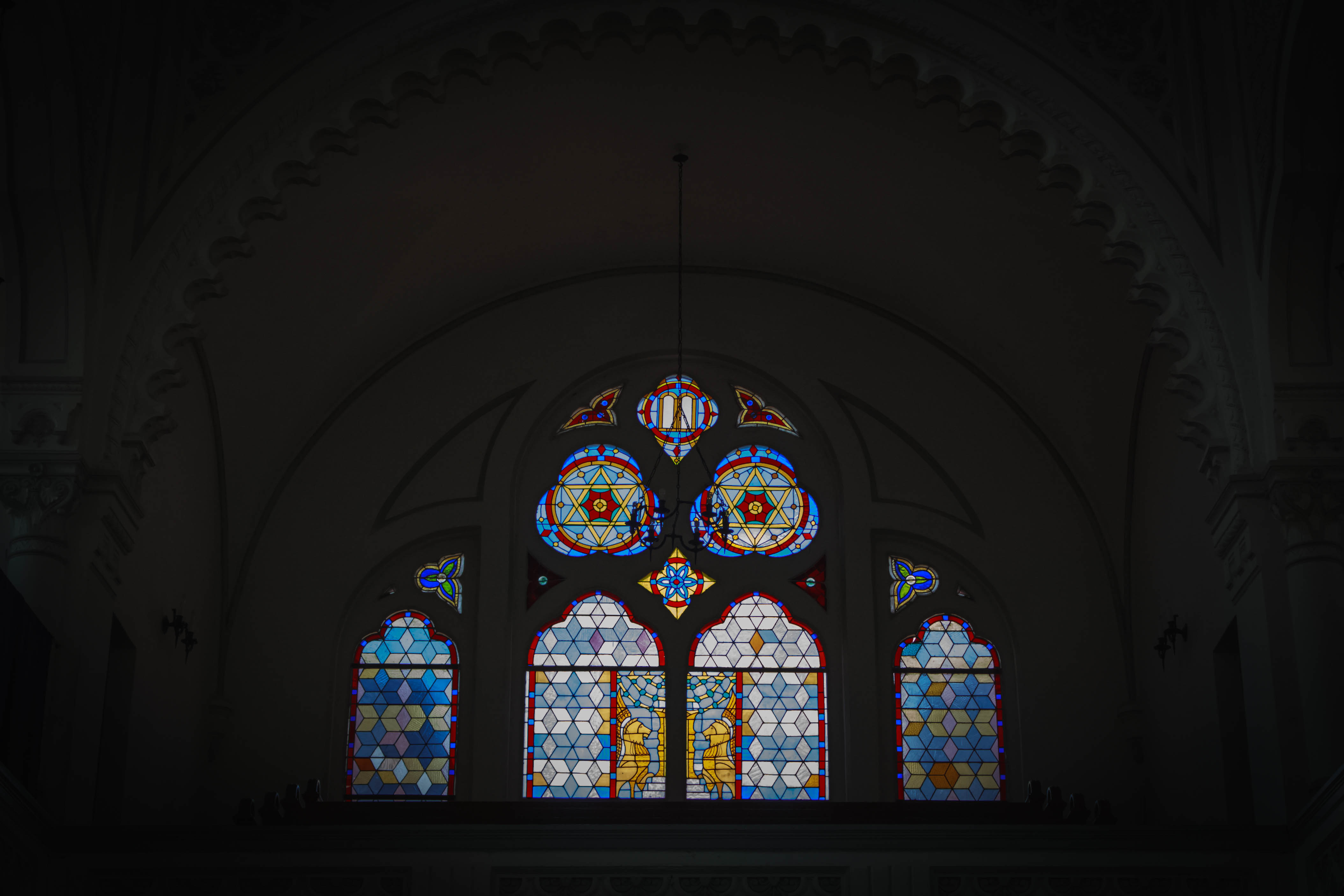

== See also ==
- History of the Jews in Romania
- List of synagogues in Romania
