= Cetate Synagogue =

Neolog synagogue in Timişoara, Romania

- Sinagoga din Cetate
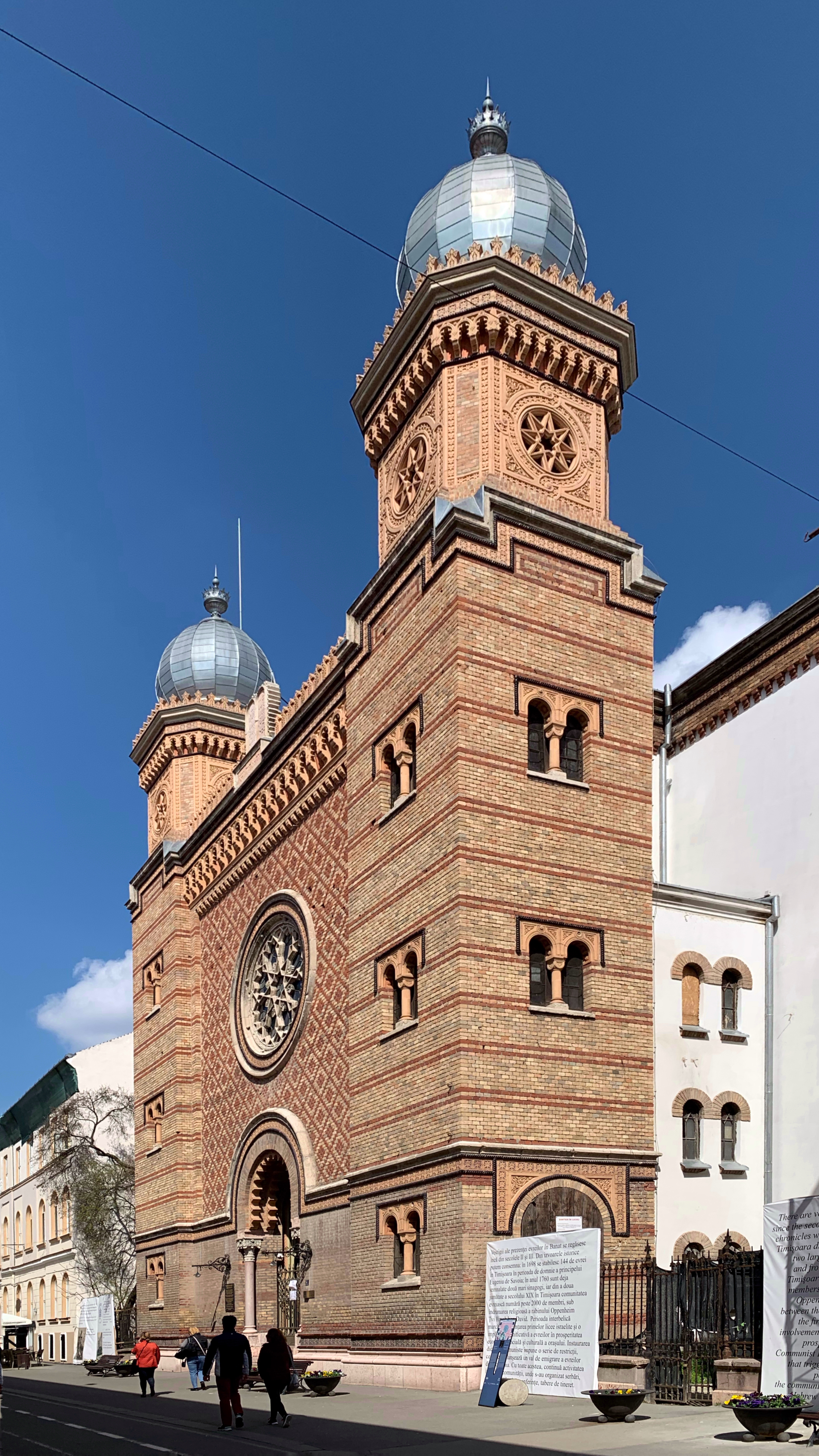
- The façade of the synagogue in 2023

Religion
- Affiliation: Neolog Judaism
- Rite: Nusach Ashkenaz
- Ecclesiastical or organizational status: Synagogue (1865–1985); Profane use (during WWII); Concert hall (2005–2017); Synagogue (since 2022)
- Ownership: Federation of the Jewish Communities in Romania
- Status: Active

Location
- Location: 6 Mărășești Street, Timișoara
- Interactive map of Cetate Synagogue
- Coordinates: 45°45′23″N 21°13′33″E

Architecture
- Architect: Carl Schumann
- Type: Synagogue architecture
- Style: Eclectic; Moorish Revival; Romanesque Revival
- Groundbreaking: 1863
- Completed: 1865

Specifications
- Capacity: 3,000
- Dome: 2
- Materials: Brick

Monument istoric
- Official name: Sinagoga din Cetate
- Type: Architectural
- Reference no.: TM-II-m-A-06150

The Cetate Synagogue (Romanian: Sinagoga din Cetate) is a Neolog Jewish congregation and synagogue, located on Mărășești Street in the Cetate district of Timișoara, in Timiș County, Romania. Designed by Carl Schumann in an eclectic architectural style, the synagogue was completed in 1865.

The synagogue is included on the National Register of Historic Monuments in Romania. The synagogue closed in 1985; was repurposed as a concert hall, and then reopened as a synagogue and tourist attraction in 2022.

== History ==
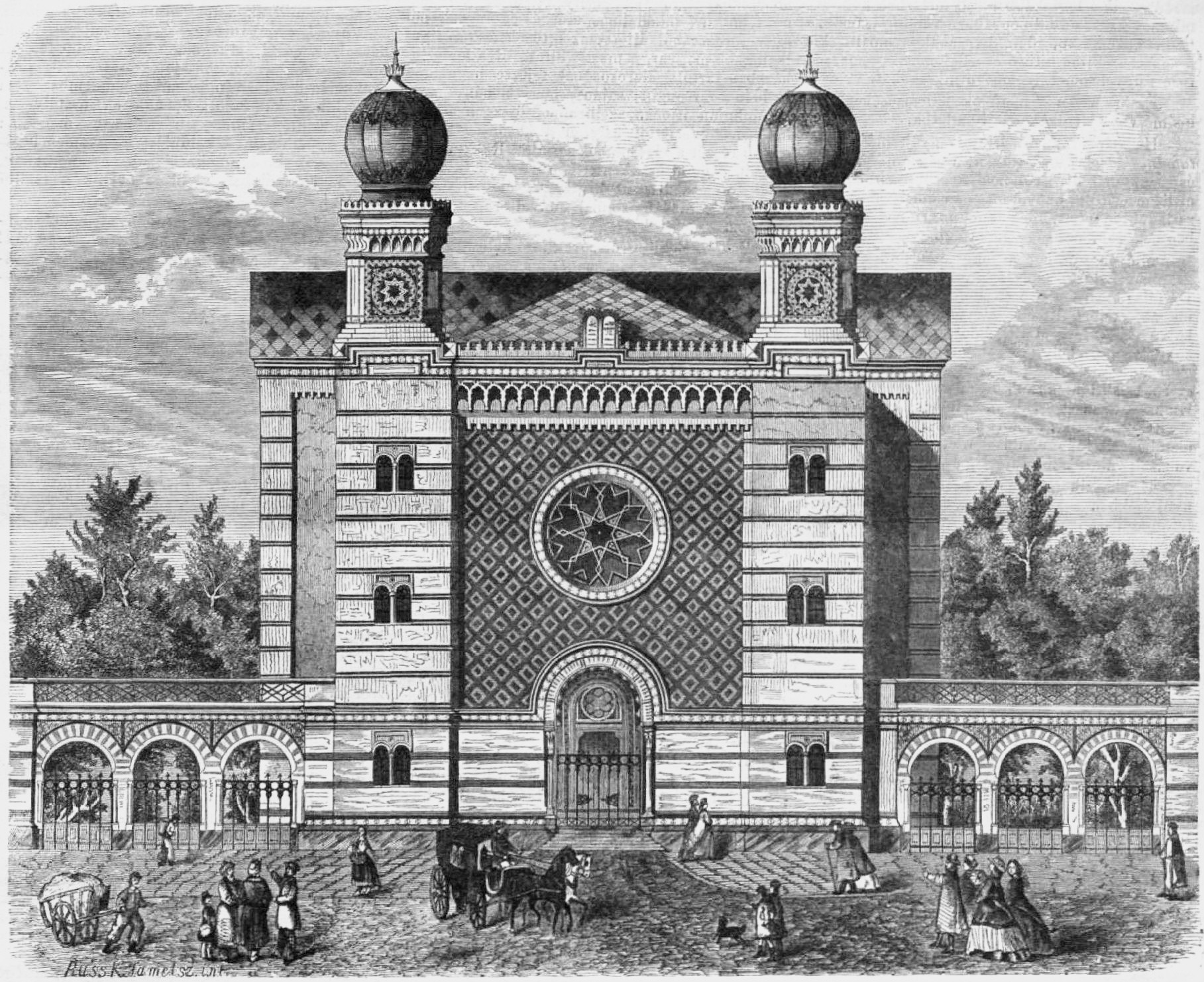
Illustration of the synagogue by Fredy Glenc (Vasárnapi Ujság, 1864)

The synagogue was built between 1863 and 1864, with completion works extended until 1865. The construction project was entrusted to the Viennese architect Carl Schumann. First Rabbi Mór Hirschfeld had taken the initiative to appeal to members of the community, who donated the necessary funds to purchase two plots near the Judenhof ("Jewish Quarter") from the Janicsáry family and the Piarist college. Ignátz S. Eisenstädter, the cashier and later, between 1870 and 1890, the president of the community, played a key role in the organizing committee under the leadership of Marcus Grünbaum. The construction of the synagogue was done by Lipót Baumhorn, who, in addition to the one in Timișoara, built many other synagogues in Brașov, Rijeka, and Budapest, and also some important civil buildings, including in Timișoara. The building was originally called the New Synagogue.

The synagogue was inaugurated on 19 September 1865, at 10 o'clock, one day before the eve of Rosh HaShanah, being re-inaugurated two years later, in 1867, in the presence of Emperor Franz Joseph I of the Austro-Hungarian Empire. 1867 also marked the establishment of the dual monarchy of Austria-Hungary, and the year of the acquisition of full citizenship by the Jews of the Empire. The synagogue served the Neolog Jewish community for nearly 140 years.

Due to the decline in the number of Jews leaving for Israel after World War II, the synagogue was closed in 1985. In 2001, the Jewish community of Timișoara ceded the building to the Philharmonic Society for a period of 50 years, to be used as a concert hall. It was reopened for the first time in 20 years in September 2005, when it hosted a concert organized by the Banatul Philharmonic. Currently, the synagogue has returned to the administration of the Federation of the Jewish Communities in Romania. Rehabilitation work on the synagogue began in December 2017. The synagogue will again be used as a place of prayer, possibly with a space set up for a museum of Jews of Timișoara.

== Architecture ==
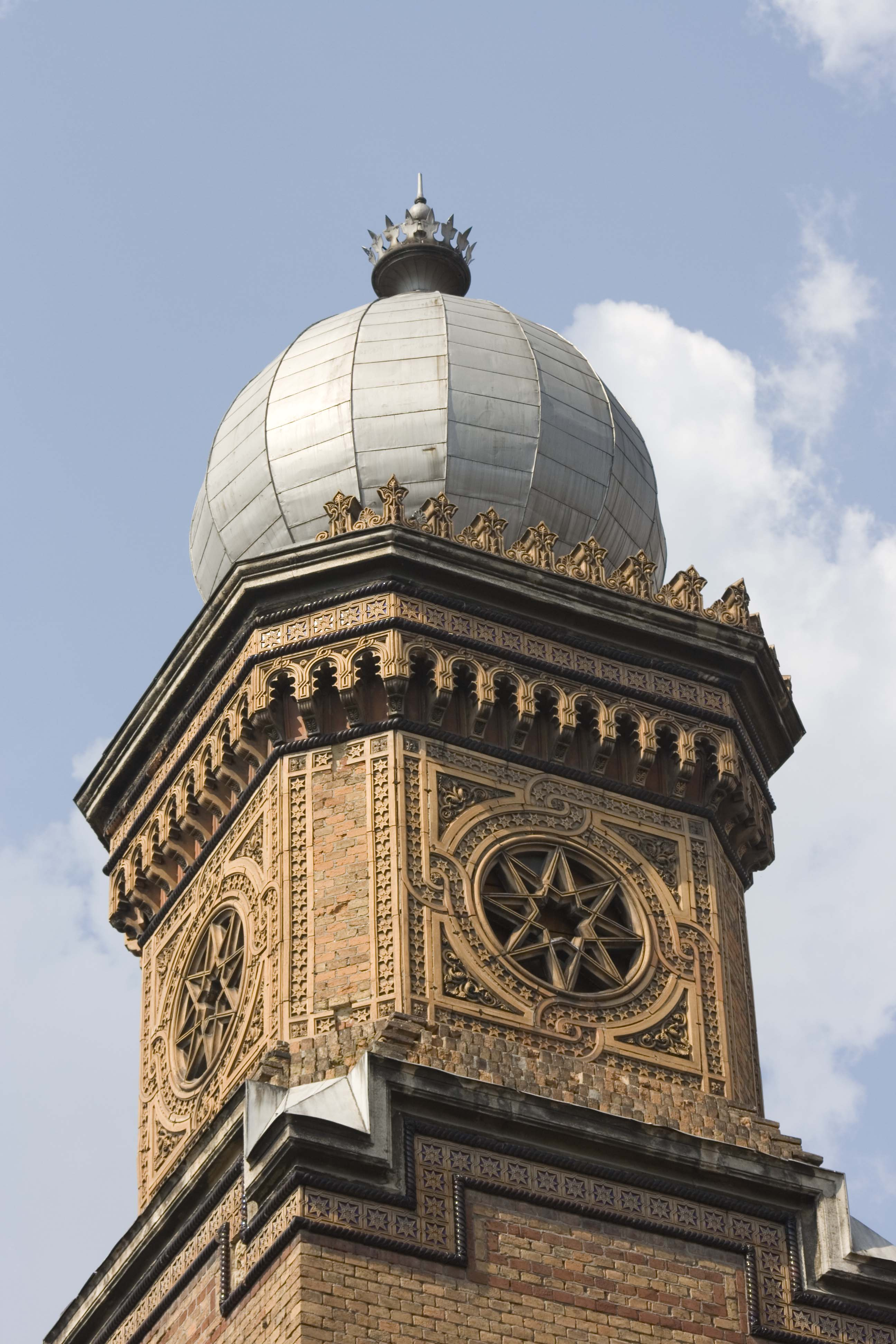
Architectural details of one of the towers

Cetate Synagogue is one of the most distinctive and original buildings in the city. It has an eclectic style, typical of the second half of the 19th century, with ornaments of Moorish Revival and Romanesque Revival styles, with decorations specific to Judaism. The layout of the building is a central, cruciform one, to which the body of the vestibule, flanked by the two towers of the building, is added to the west. The towers are capped with onion-shaped domes and flank a Moorish horseshoe arch supported by Corinthian columns. The main facade is built of apparent brick and glazed ceramic tiles. The alternation of the use of two-tone bricks draws geometric motifs on the entire surface of the main facade, but dominated by the large rose window, in which the symbol of the Star of David can be noticed.

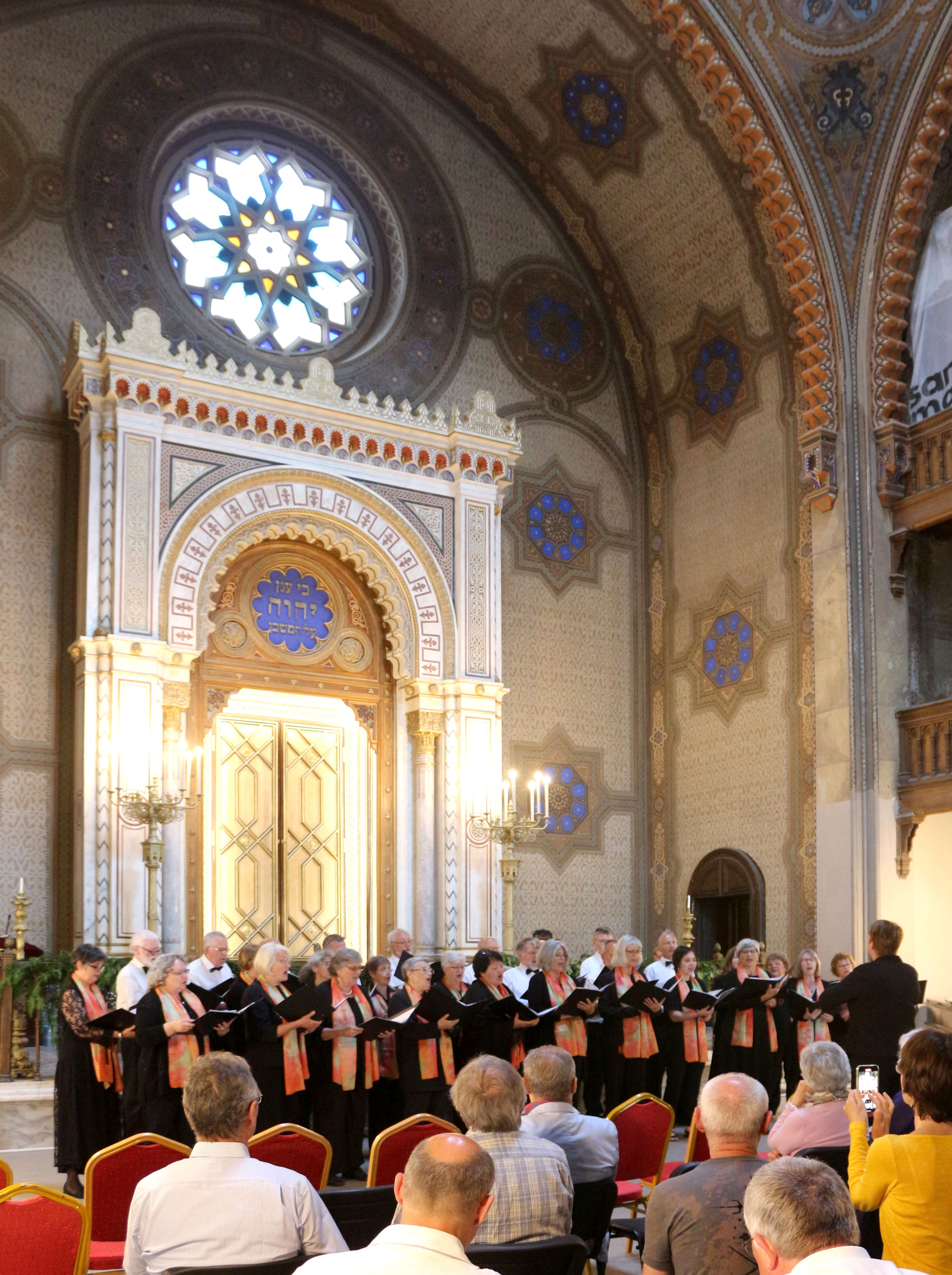
Choral concert inside the synagogue

The entrance is made through a vestibule (pulish), which has two houses on the sides of the access stairs leading to the lodges reserved for women and to the towers. From the vestibule one enters into a rectangular room (heichal) reserved for men. It has wooden benches carved and covered with a dome on pendants, connected to deep space by four arches. Inside, the rich decorations and stained glass windows of great art are complemented by a Wegenstein organ, made by Carl Leopold Wegenstein in 1899. The capacity is approximately 3,000 people.

== See also ==
- History of the Jews in Romania
- List of synagogues in Romania
