= List of synagogues in Romania =

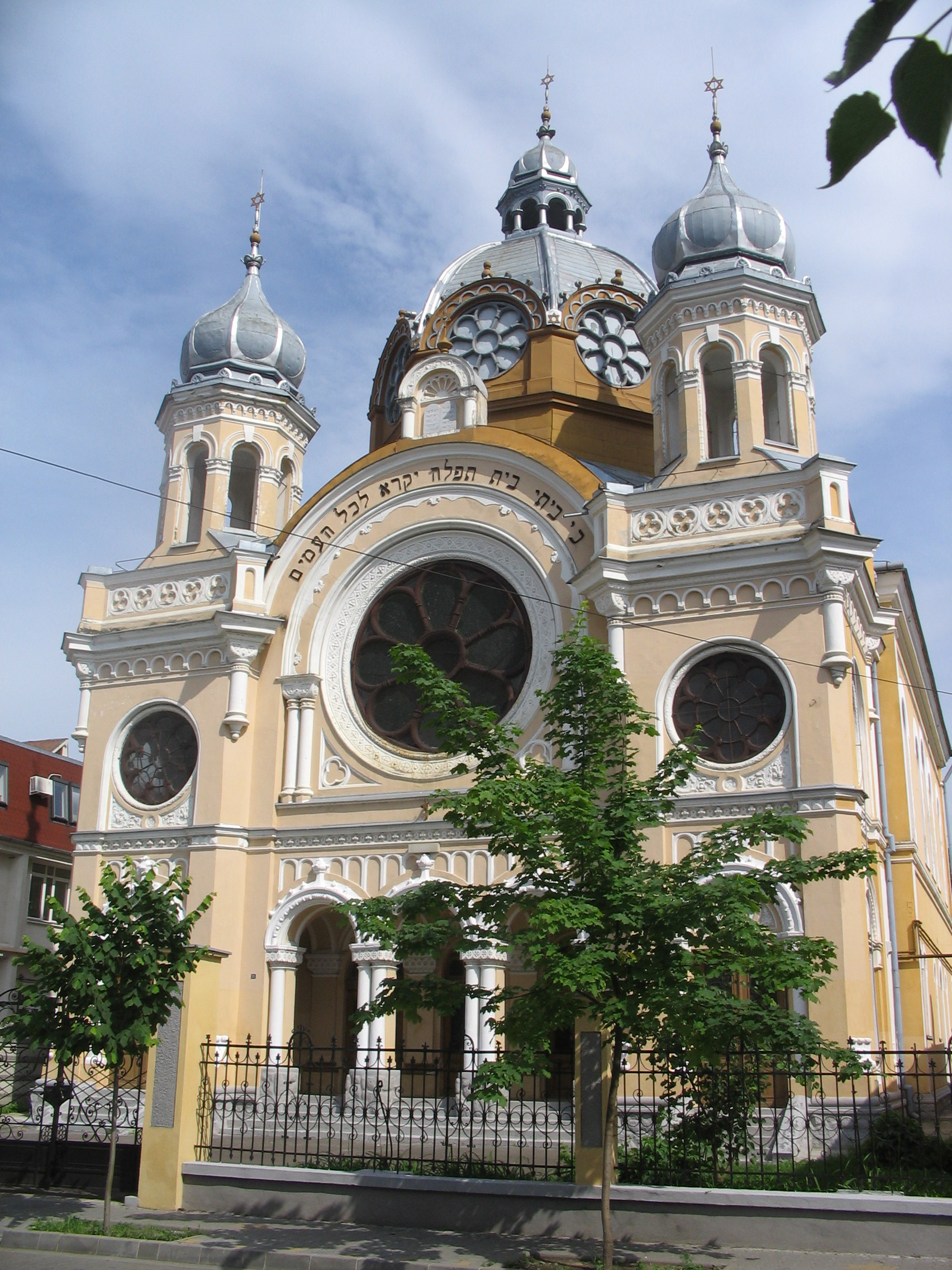
Recently renovated huge Status Quo Synagogue in Târgu Mureș. It was built between 1899 and 1900 according to the plans of the Austrian Jewish architect Jakob Gartner.

This list of synagogues in Romania contains active, otherwise used and destroyed synagogues in Romania. The list of Romanian synagogues is not necessarily complete, as only a negligible number of sources testify to the existence of some synagogues.

== Banat ==
Location	Name	Built	Destroyed	Remarks	Picture
Timișoara	Cetate Synagogue	1863–1865	stand	Building in neglected condition. It is in the city was included on the list of historical monuments in Timiș County in 2004.	
Timișoara	Fabric Synagogue	1897–1899	stand	It is in a very dilapidated condition.	
Timișoara	Iosefin Synagogue	1910	stand	It has recently undergone renovations.	
Timișoara	Timișoara Orthodox Synagogue	19th century	stand	It has recently undergone renovations.	
Timișoara	Synagogue of Cuza Vodă street	1843	?	No more information about it.	
Caransebeș	Caransebeș Synagogue	1893	stand	In 2004 the synagogue was declared a historical monument. It is still open, sometimes organized organ concerts.	
Lugoj	Lugoj Synagogue	1843	stand	Other name: Small Synagogue.	
Reșița	Reșița Synagogue	1907–1910	stand	Building in neglected condition.	
Balinț	Balinț Synagogue	?	?	No more information about it.	
Sânnicolau Mare	Sânnicolau Mare Synagogue	?	?	No more information about it.	
Buziaș	Buziaș Synagogue	1886	?	No more information about it.	
Făget	Făget Synagogue	?	?	No more information about it.	

== Crișana ==
Location	Name	Built	Destroyed	Remarks	Picture
Arad	Arad Neolog Synagogue	1827–1834	stand		
Arad	Arad Orthodox Synagogue	1920			
Oradea	Oradea Orthodox Synagogue	1890	stand		
Oradea	Oradea Sion Synagogue	1878	stand	A monumental building in good condition. Other name: Oradea Neolog Synagogue.	
Oradea	Parasita Synagogue	c. 19th century	stand	It is in an extremely dilapidated condition.	
Zalău	Zalău Synagogue	?	?	No more information about it.	
Suplacu de Barcău	Suplacu de Barcău Synagogue	?	?	No more information about it.	
Sântana	Sântana Synagogue	?	?	No more information about it.	
Sebiș	Sebiș Synagogue	?	?	No more information about it.	
Săvârșin	Săvârșin Synagogue	?	?	No more information about it.	
Salonta	Salonta Synagogue	?	?	No more information about it.	
Săcueni	Săcueni Synagogue	?	?	No more information about it.	
Pecica	Pecica Synagogue	?	?	No more information about it.	
Pâncota	Pâncota Synagogue	?	?	No more information about it.	
Marghita	Marghita Synagogue	?	?	No more information about it.	
Diosig	Diosig Synagogue	?	?	No more information about it.	
Cermei	Cermei Synagogue	?	?	No more information about it.	
Gurahonț	Gurahonț Synagogue	?	?	No more information about it.	

== Dobruja ==
Location	Name	Built	Destroyed	Remarks	Picture
Babadag	Babadag Synagogue	1893	?	No more information about it.	
Tulcea	Tulcea Synagogue	1888	stand	It has recently undergone renovations.	
Constanța	Great Synagogue	1911	stand	It is in an extremely dilapidated condition. Restoration completed in 2026.	
Constanța	Sephardic Temple	1905–1908	1989	The sephardic synagogue was heavily damaged during the Second World War when it was used as an ammunition warehouse, later further damaged by an earthquake, and was demolished under the rule of Nicolae Ceaușescu.	

== Maramureș ==
Location	Name	Built	Destroyed	Remarks	Picture
Satu Mare	Synagogue of Țibleș street	1912	?	No more information about it.	
Satu Mare	Satu Mare Status Quo Synagogue	1889–1892	after 1945	It will be demolished sometime after 1945.	
Satu Mare	Satu Mare Synagogue	1889	stand	Other name: Great Temple, Decebal Street Syangogue.	
Satu Mare	Talmud Tora Synagogue	1927	stand	Next to Great Temple of Satu Mare.	
Baia Mare	Baia Mare Synagogue	1885	stand	The building is not in good condition.	
Seini	Seini Synagogue	1904	stand	The building is not in good condition.	
Sighetu Marmaţiei	Vijnițer Klaus Temple	1885	stand	It has recently undergone renovations.	
Carei	Carei Synagogue	1866	stand	The building is not in good condition.	
Carei	Carei Orthodox Synagogue		destroyed		
Vișeu de Sus	Vișeu de Sus Synagogue	?	?	No more information about it.	
Tășnad	Tășnad Synagogue	?	?	No more information about it.	
Halmeu	Halmeu Old Synagogue	?	?	No more information about it.	
Halmeu	Halmeu New Synagogue	?	?	No more information about it.	
Orașu Nou	Orașu Nou Synagogue	?	?	No more information about it.	

== Moldavia ==
Location	Name	Built	Destroyed	Remarks	Picture
Bacău	Synagogue Rabin Avram Arie Rosen	?	stand		
Bacău	Cerealiștilor Temple	1906	stand		
Botoșani	Synagogue "Hoihe Sil"	1834	?		
Botoșani	Yiddish Synagogue of Botoșani	?	stand		
Fălticeni	Fălticeni Synagogue	1890	?		
Fălticeni	Fălticeni Great Synagogue	1838–1854	stand	The building is not in good condition.	
Galați	Craftsmen's Temple	1896	stand	Renovated in 2014	
Iași	Cismarilor Synagogue	19th century	stand	It is in a very dilapidated condition.	
Iași	Great Synagogue	1671	stand		
Iași	Merarilor Synagogue	1865	stand		
Iași	Pod Roșu Synagogue	1810	demolished	in the Podu Ros section of Iasi.	https://upload.wikimedia.org/wikipedia/commons/8/82/Gesher_edom_shul.jpg
Tecuci	Synagogue of Gh. Asachi street	c. 1840	stand		
Tecuci	Synagogue of Bran street	?	?		
Vatra Dornei	Synagogue of Luceafărul street	?	stand		
Vatra Dornei	Vatra Dornei Great temple	1898–1902	stand	Ruined building.	
Focșani	"Ahai Vereai" Synagogue	1889	?	stand	
Roman	Croitorilor Synagogue Synagogue	1850	?	Other name: "Poale Tedek" Synagogue.	
Roman	Leipziger Synagogue	?	stand		
Piatra Neamț	Piatra Neamț Synagogue	?	stand		
Piatra Neamț	Wooden Synagogue of Piatra Neamț	1766	stand	Central Synagogue	
Bârlad	Bârlad Synagogue	1789	stand		
Buhuși	Buhuși Synagogue	1858	stand	Other name: Curtea Rabinică	
Dorohoi	Dorohoi Synagogue	1790	stand		
Huși	Huși Synagogue	1860	?		
Odobești	Odobești Synagogue	?	stand		
Săveni	Săveni Synagogue	?	stand		
Vaslui	Vaslui Synagogue	?	stand		
Suceava	Gah Synagogue	1870	stand		
Suceava	Ițcani Synagogue	19th century	2009	By the early 2000s, only its walls remained. In 2009, these were also dismantled.	
Câmpulung Moldovenesc	Câmpulung Moldovenesc Old Synagogue	?	stand		
Câmpulung Moldovenesc	Great Synagogue of Câmpulung Moldovenesc	?	stand		
Câmpulung Moldovenesc	Gah Synagogue of Câmpulung Moldovenesc	1874	stand		
Gura Humorului	Great Synagogue of Gura Humorului	1860	stand		
Hârlău	Great Synagogue of Hârlău	1812–1814	stand		
Târgu Neamț	Meseriaşilor Synagogue	1870	stand		
Rădăuți	Synagogue on Topliței street, Rădăuți	?	stand		
Rădăuți	Synagogue on 1 Mai street, Rădăuți	?	stand		
Rădăuți	Great Temple of Rădăuți	1883	stand		
Siret	Great Temple of Siret	1840	stand		
Târgu Ocna	Târgu Ocna Synagogue	?	?	No more information about it.	
Panciu	Panciu Synagogue	?	?	No more information about it.	
Bârlad	Bârlad Synagogue	?	?	No more information about it.	

== Muntenia ==
Location	Name	Built	Destroyed	Remarks	Picture
Brăila	Brăila Great Synagogue	1865			
Pitești	Pitești Synagogue	1919–1925	stand		
Râmnicu Sărat	Râmnicu Sărat Synagogue	1855	stand		
Târgoviște	Târgoviște Synagogue	?			
Ploiești	Ploiești Synagogue	1794–1795	stand	Other names: Beth Israel Synagogue.	
Buzău	Buzău Synagogue	1855	stand	Ruined building.	

== Oltenia ==
Location	Name	Built	Destroyed	Remarks	Picture
Drobeta Turnu Severin	Drobeta Turnu Severin Synagogue	?	stand	Notary's office.	
Caracal	Caracal Synagogue	1902	stand		
Craiova	Craiova Synagogue	1829			

== Transylvania ==
Location	Name	Built	Destroyed	Remarks	Picture
Bezidu Nou	Bezidu Nou Synagogue				
Brașov	Brașov Synagogue	1898–1901	stand	It has recently undergone renovations.	
Brașov	Brașov Orthodox Synagogue	1877	stand		
Cluj-Napoca	Cluj Orthodox Synagogue	1850–1851	stand	After the war, a small number of Jews who returned from deportation no longer used it as a synagogue. It has since been used for various purposes.	
Cluj-Napoca	Synagogue of George Barițiu street	?	?		
Cluj-Napoca	Reformed Synagogue	1886–1887	stand	Other names: Sinagoga Neologă, Templul deportaților. Partially rebuilt in 1927.	
Cluj-Napoca	"Șas Hevra" Temple	1922	?		
Bistrița	Bistrița Synagogue	1856	stand		
Borsec	Borsec Synagogue	?	?		
Gheorgheni	Gheorgheni Synagogue	1927–1928	stand		
Gherla	Gherla Synagogue	1903	stand	The building is in a life-threatening condition. Renovation planned.	
Hațeg	Hațeg Synagogue	1884	stand		
Jibou	Jibou Synagogue	?	?		
Mediaș	Mediaș Synagogue	1896	stand		
Orăștie	Orăștie Synagogue	1878	stand		
Sibiu	Sibiu Synagogue	1898–1899	stand		
Sighișoara	Sighișoara Synagogue	1903	stand		
Târnăveni	Târnăveni Synagogue	19th century	stand		
Turda	Turda Synagogue	1926	stand	The building is in poor condition.	
Șimleul Silvaniei	Șimleul Silvaniei Synagogue	1876	stand	It houses a Holocaust museum.	
Târgu Mureș	Status Quo Synagogue	1899–1900	stand	It has recently undergone renovations.	
Alba Iulia	Old Synagogue Synagogue	1840	stand		
Dej	"Înfrățirea" Temple	?	stand		
Deva	Great Temple of Deva	1896	stand		
Teiuș	Teiuș Synagogue	?	?	No more information about it.	
Sfântu Gheorghe	Sfântu Gheorghe Synagogue	?	?	No more information about it.	
Reteag	Reteag Synagogue	?	?	No more information about it.	
Reghin	Reghin Synagogue	1866	?	No more information about it.	
Mireșu Mare	Mireșu Mare Synagogue	?	?	No more information about it.	
Luduș	Luduș Synagogue	19th century	1944	Burned down.	
Hida	Hida Synagogue	?	?	No more information about it.	
Bichiș	Bichiș Synagogue	19th century	stand	Now a "Pálinka" center.	
Cehu Silvaniei	Cehu Silvaniei Synagogue	?	?	No more information about it.	
Făgăraș	Făgăraș Synagogue	1848	stand	Abandoned building.	

== Literature ==
- Aristide Streja – Lucian Schwarz: Synagogues of Romania, Editura Hasefer, 1997, ISBN 9739235034
- Klein Rudolf: Zsinagógák Magyarországon 1782–1918, TERC Kft., Budapest, 2011, ISBN 9789639968011
