= Sephardic Temple (Constanța) =

Demolished synagogue in Constanța, Romania

- Romanian: Templul Sefard din Constanța
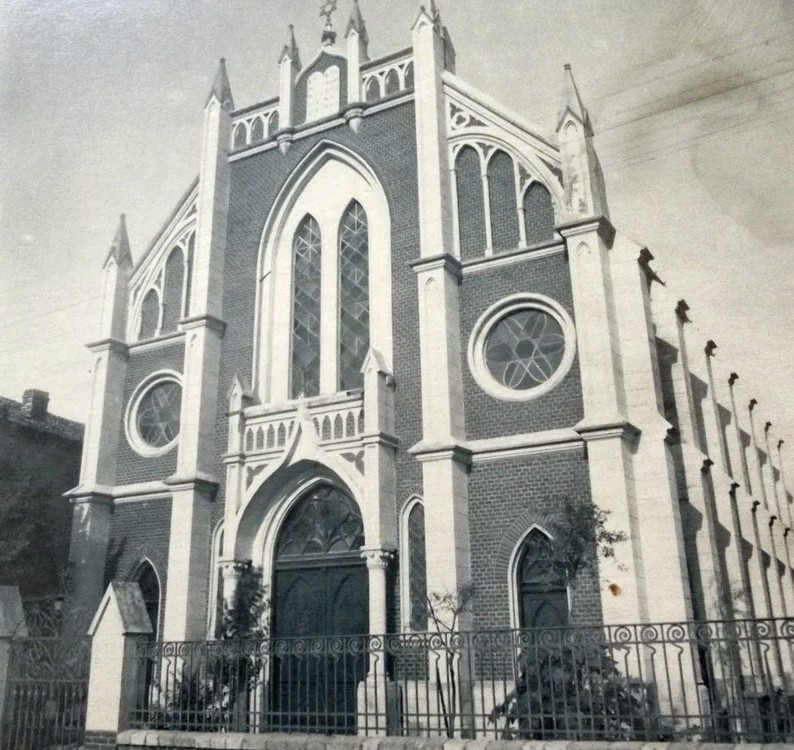
- The former synagogue, in 1910

Religion
- Affiliation: Judaism (former)
- Rite: Nusach Sefard
- Ecclesiastical or organisational status: Synagogue (1908–1989); Profane use (during WWII)
- Status: Demolished

Location
- Location: 18 Mircea Street, Constanța, Constanța County, Dobruja
- Country: Romania
- Interactive map of Sephardic Temple

Architecture
- Architect: Adolf Lintz
- Type: Synagogue architecture
- Style: Catalan Gothic
- Established: c. 1830s (as a congregation)
- Groundbreaking: 1905
- Completed: 1908
- Demolished: 1989
- Materials: Brick

The Sephardic Temple of Constanța (Romanian: Templul Sefard din Constanța), that was also known as the Spanish Rite Temple Israelite, was a Jewish congregation and synagogue, located at 18 Mircea Street, Constanța, in the Constanța County, in the Dobruja region of Romania. Designed by Adolf Lintz in the Catalan Gothic style, the synagogue was completed in 1905.

The synagogue served the Spanish Jewish community and services were conducted in the Sephardic rite.

== History ==
Sephardic Jews from Anatolia settled in Constanța in the 1830s and established a congregation. They obtained a plot of land for a cemetery in 1853, and leased land to construct a synagogue in 1867.

The Sephardic Temple was built between 1905 and 1908 in a Catalan Gothic architectural style following the blueprints of Austrian architect Adolf Lintz and decorated by painter Moritz Finkelstein. The temple was built in the place of the 1867 synagogue, on a piece of land on Mircea Street, a donation from Ismail Kemal Bey. The synagogue was heavily damaged during World War II when it was used as an ammunition warehouse, later further damaged by an earthquake in 1977, and was demolished in 1989 under the rule of Nicolae Ceaușescu.

== Gallery ==
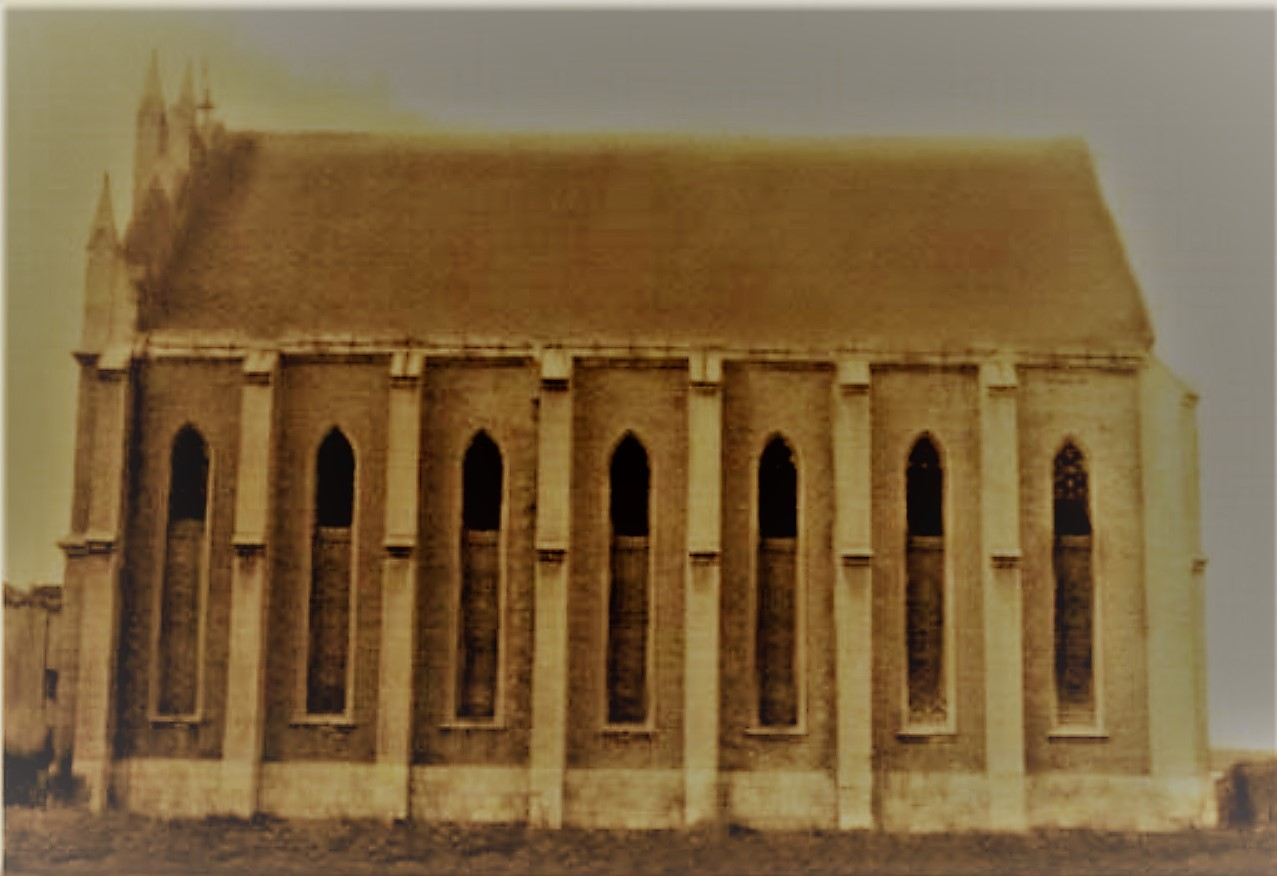
Spanish Temple, 1911

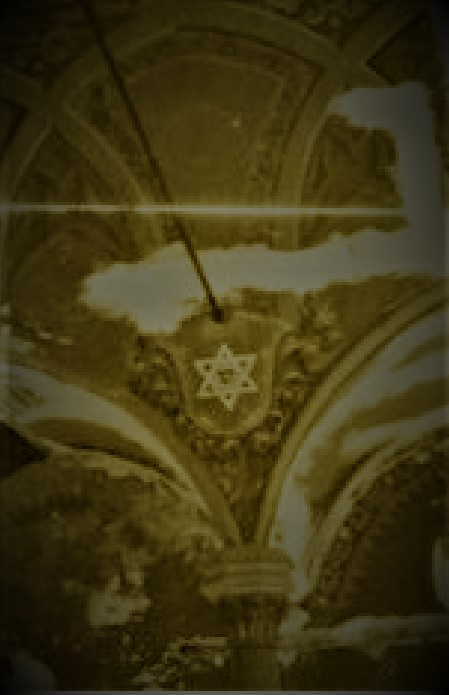
Spanish Temple, interior, 1941

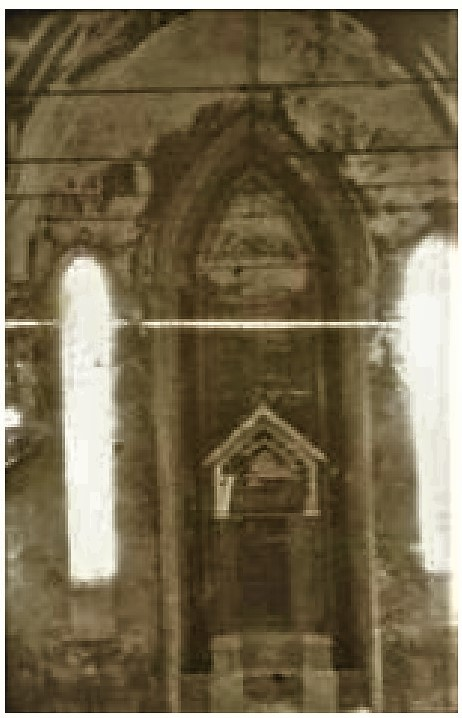
Spanish Temple, interior, 1942

== See also ==
- History of the Jews in Romania
- List of synagogues in Romania
