= Federation of the Jewish Communities in Romania =

Federation of the Jewish Communities in Romania Federația Comunităților Evreiești din România–Cultul Mozaic הפדרציה של הקהילות היהודיות ברומניה
- President: Silviu Vexler
- Founded: 16 February 1936
- Registered: 15 June 1995
- Ideology: Jewish minority interests
- National affiliation: National Minorities Parliamentary Group
- Chamber of Deputies: 1 / 329
- Senate: 0 / 136
- European Parliament: 0 / 32

Website
- www.jewishfed.ro/index.php

The Federation of the Jewish Communities in Romania (Romanian: Federația Comunităților Evreiești din România - Cultul mozaic, FCER) is a cultural association in Romania representing the Jewish community. The FCER has the right to one seat in the Chamber of Deputies.

== History ==
The organisation was originally founded as the Federation of Unions of Jewish Communities in Romania (Federaţiei Uniunilor de Comunităţi Evreiești din România, FUCER) in 1936 by the Unions of Communities of the Old Kingdom and of the Provinces (Uniunile de Comunităţi din Vechiul Regat și din Provincii), which included the Union of Jewish Communities of the Old Kingdom, the Union of Jewish Communities of Transylvania and Banat, the Union of Jewish Communities of Bucovina, and the Union of Jewish Communities of Bessarabia. The first elected president of the organisation was Sigmund Birman, a philanthropist and industrialist. From 1941 to 1944 it was banned by the government of dictator Ion Antonescu, and replaced with the pro-government Jewish Centre of Romania (Centrala Evreilor din România), before being re-established in 1945. It took on its current name in 1949.

The FCER contested the 1996 general elections, receiving 12,746 votes (0.1%) and winning a single seat in the Chamber of Deputies under the electoral law allowing organisations representing ethnic minority groups to be exempt from the electoral threshold only applied as long as they received 10% of the vote required for a single seat in the Chamber of Deputies. The Jewish communities body has won a seat in every election since.

== Election results ==
Election	Chamber of Deputies			Senate		
Election	Votes	%	Seats	Votes	%	Seats
1996	12,746	0.10	1	–	–	–
2000	12,629	0.11	1	–	–	–
2004	8,449	0.08	1			
2008	22,393	0.33	1	–	–	–
2012	10,019	0.14	1	–	–	–
2016	5,069	0.07	1	–	–	–
2020	3,509	0.06	1	–	–	–
2024	5,281	0.06	1	–	–	–

== Leaders ==
- Sigmund Birman (1936–1940)
- Wilhelm Filderman (1940–1941; 1945–1947)
- Maximilian Popper (1948–1951)
- Israel Bacalu (1951–1961)
- Moses Rosen (1964–1994)
- Nicolae Cajal (1994–2004)
- Iulian Sorin (interim, 2004–2005)
- Aurel Vainer (2005–2020)
- Silviu Vexler (since 2020)

== See also ==
- Jewish Party, a Jewish political party in Romania between 1931 and 1948.
- Union of Romanian Jews, a Jewish political organisation in Romania (1909–1938 and 1944–1946)
- Jewish Democratic Committee, a Communist-aligned organisation representing the Jewish community in Romania between 1945 and 1953.
