= Aurel Vainer =

Romanian economist and politician (1932–2021)

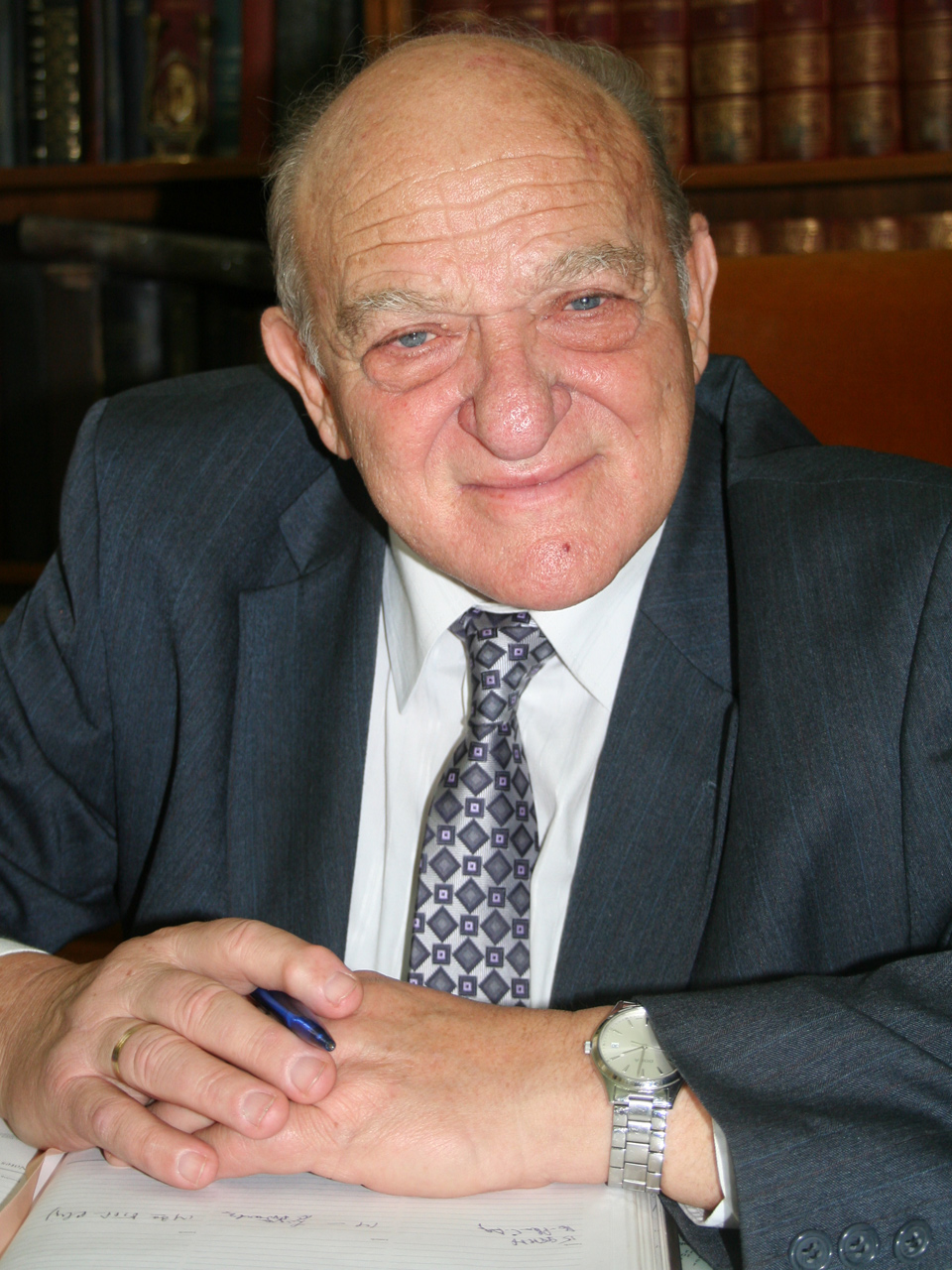
- Aurel Vainer
- Born: 10 January 1932; Ștefănești, Botoșani, Romania
- Died: 31 October 2021 (aged 89); Bucharest, Romania
- Citizenship: Romania
- Occupations: Economist; Politician

Aurel Vainer (10 January 1932 – 31 October 2021) was a Romanian economist and politician. He was a leader of the Romanian Jewish community, and also the vice president of the Romanian Chamber of Commerce.

Vainer was elected leader of the Jewish community in 2005. He retired in November 2020, after 15 years.
