= Sephardic Jews in Romania =

Jewish community in Romania

Total population
- <1,000

Regions with significant populations
- Bucharest

Languages
- Ladino, Romanian

Religion
- Judaism

Related ethnic groups
- Sephardic Jews

Sephardic Jews have played an important historical role in Romania, although their numbers in the country have dwindled to a few hundred, with most living in the capital, Bucharest. Antisemitic pogroms and economic strife lead to mass emigration out of the country in the 20th century.

The Sephardic community constituted a small but distinct minority within the broader, predominantly Ashkenazi Jewish population of Romania. During the interwar period, the Sephardic Jewish community in Romania reached its demographic peak, with between 12,000 and 15,000 members formally registered in congregations of the Spanish rite (Rit Spaniol) across major urban centers. However, political instability and rising institutional antisemitism throughout the 1930s triggered a steady wave of emigration, reducing the permanent Sephardic population.

On the eve of World War II and the Holocaust, according to contemporary demographic estimates and historical reference records, there were approximately 7,000 Sephardic Jews living in the country in 1939, with the vast majority concentrated in the capital city of Bucharest, and smaller organized communities located in southern urban centers such as Craiova, Ploiești, and Constanța.

== History ==
=== Origins ===
Many Sephardic Jews began settling in Wallachia in the 16th century, then under Ottoman rule, although there is evidence they began settling in Romania as early as 1496 following the Spanish Inquisition and Alhambra Decree. They arrived through the Ottoman Empire, which was more welcoming towards Jewish immigration than other countries in Europe at the time.

=== Communities ===
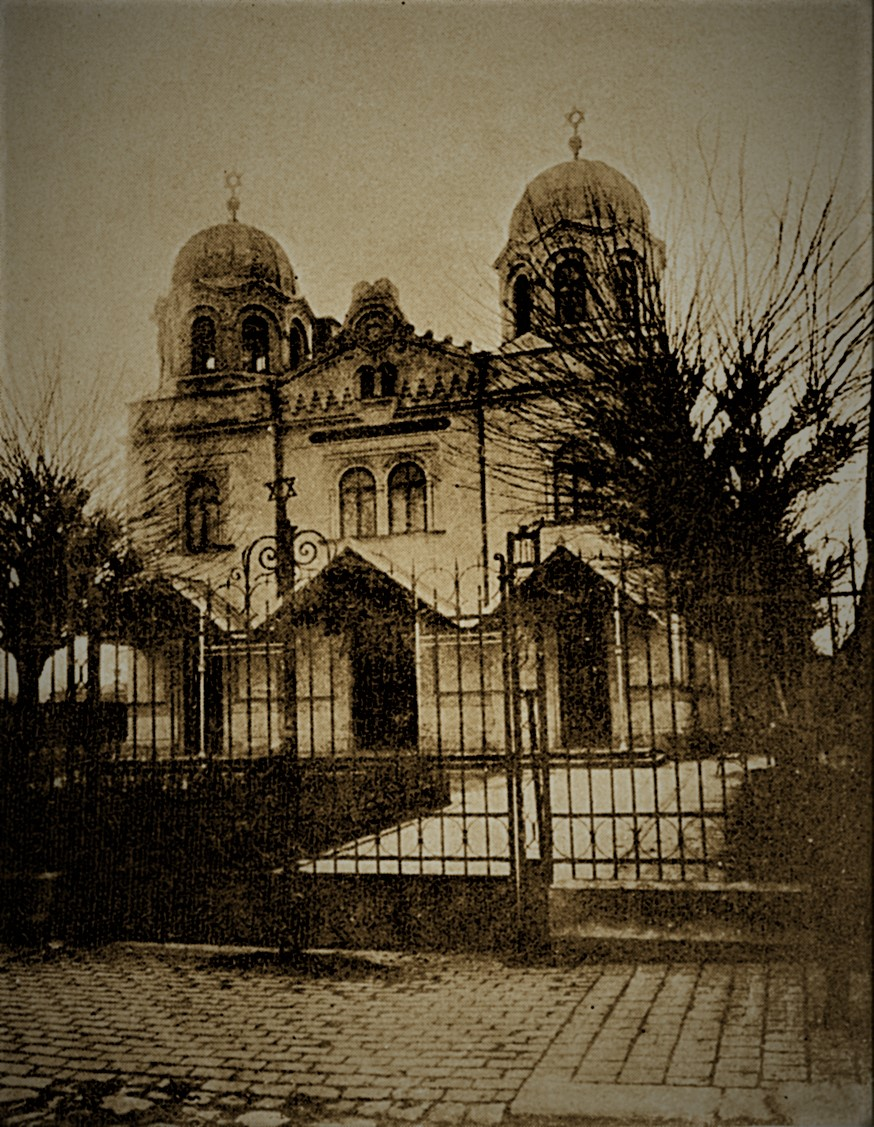
The Cahal Grande was considered one of the most beautiful synagogues in Eastern Europe, but it was destroyed during antisemitic pogroms in Romania in the early-mid 20th century.

In 1730, following advice of Jews Daniel de Fonseca and Celebi Mentz Bali, the then-ruler of Wallachia, Nicolae Mavrocordat, formally allowed Sephardic Jews to organize themselves into communities. Since then, according to historian Iuliu Barasch, many Sephardim from the Ottoman Empire began settling in Romania. However, it was not until 1819 that the first synagogue was built in the capital, Cahal Grande, with reforms by Rabbis Eliezer Papo and Damascus Eliezer.

Since the establishment of said communities, the Sephardic community in Romania thrived, despite antisemitic measures taken by government officials Ion C. Brătianu and Dimitrie A. Sturdza. In 1934, there were large Sephardic communities in Bucharest, Craiova, Ploiești, Turnu Severin, Timișoara, Corabia, Calafat, Brăila, Galați, Tulcea, Constanța and Giurgiu.

From 1921 to 1930, there was no head rabbi for the Jews in the country. 1931 saw Sabetay Djaen become the chief Sephardic rabbi for the country. He stayed until the end of the 2nd World War; then he returned to Argentina.

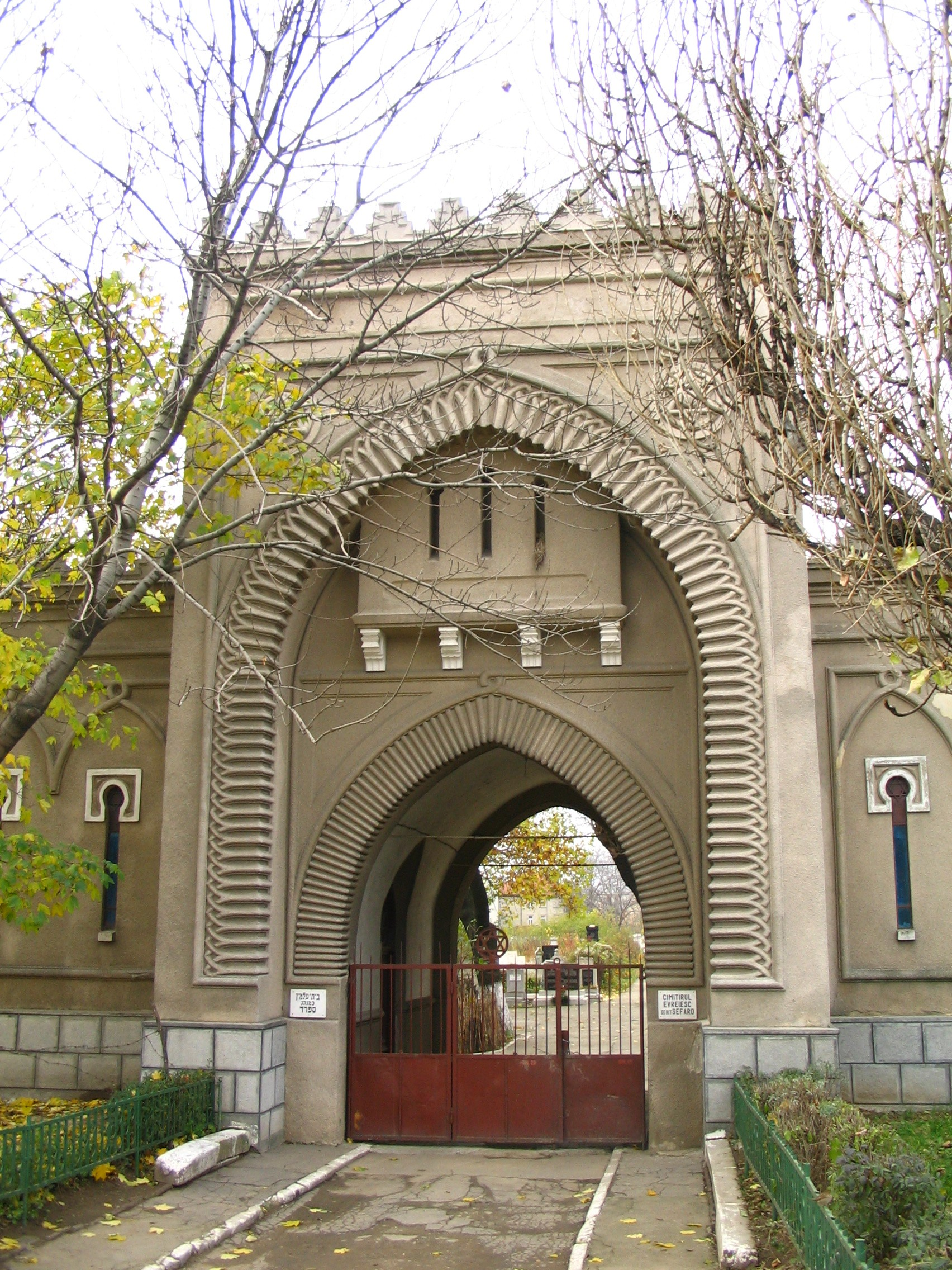
The Bucharest Sephardic Jewish Cemetery is an important monument to the community and is still in operation today.

Sephardic Jews' situation worsened in 1937, along with the rest of the Jews in Romania, suffering from antisemitic laws established by Octavian Goga's government, as well as Miron Cristea's, but especially by the National Legionary State. During the Legionary Rebellion at the Bucharest pogrom, the Cahal Grande Synagogue was burned to the ground.

== Current time ==
Following the establishment of the communist regime, Romanian Sephardic Jews emigrated en masse to Israel. Currently, there are several hundred Sephardic Jews left in Romania, the majority in Bucharest. They no longer have a synagogue exclusive to their community. There is a minute amount of Sephardic Jews who emigrated to Bucharest in modern times, mostly from Israel.

== Synagogues ==
- Grand Spanish Temple
- Spanish Small Temple
- Sephardic Temple (Constanța)

== Notable Romanian Sephardic Jews ==
- Mosko Alkalai, actor
- Mișu Benvenisti, lawyer, Zionist militant, and leader of the Romanian Jewish community
- Aristide Blank, financier, economist, arts patron and playwright
- Mauriciu Blank, banker, co-founder, alongside Iacob Marmorosch, of the Marmorosch Blank Bank
- Eliza Campus, professor, historian and author of history books and historical novels
- David Emmanuel, mathematician and member of the Romanian Academy, considered to be the founder of the modern mathematics school in Romania
- Moses Gaster, Hakham of the Spanish and Portuguese Jewish congregation of London, historian, publicist, folklorist and Hebrew and Romanian linguist
- Salomon Iosif Halfon, banker and philanthropist
- Clara Haskil, classical pianist, renowned as an interpreter of the classical and early romantic repertoire
- Hillel Manoah, banker and philanthropist and honorary consul of the Ottoman Empire, president of the Spanish rite Jewish community in Bucharest
- Jacob L. Moreno, psychiatrist, psychosociologist, and educator, the founder of psychodrama, and the foremost pioneer of group psychotherapy
- Maria Ventura, actress and theatre director

== See also ==
- Sephardic Jews in Hungary

== Bibliography ==
- Waldman, Felicia; Tudorancea Ciuciu, Anca (2016). Tales and Traces of Sephardic Bucharest. Bucharest: Iniciativa Culturală. ISBN 978-606-93892-7-0.
