= List of synagogues in Bucharest =

This is a list of synagogues in Bucharest.

Name	Romanian name	Year built	Location	Notes
Beit Hamidrash Synagogue	Sinagoga Bet Hamidraș	18th century	Calea Moșilor	
Cahal Grande Synagogue (Great Spanish Temple)	Sinagoga Cahal Grande (Templul Mare Spaniol)	1818	Văcărești	destroyed during the 1941 Bucharest pogrom
Cahal Cicu Synagogue (Small Spanish Temple)	Sinagoga Cahal Cicu (Templul Mic spaniol)	1846		destroyed during the 1941 Bucharest pogrom
Faith Temple (Hevrah Amuna)	Templul Credința	1926		
Great Synagogue (Polish)	Sinagoga Mare (Poloneză)	1845		
Holy Union Temple	Templul Unirea Sfântă	1836		
Malbim Synagogue	Sinagoga Malbim	1864		demolished in the 1980s
Choral Temple	Templul Coral	1866		
Yeshua Tova Synagogue	Sinagoga Eșua Tova	1827		

- Synagogue of Calea Moșilor
- Chabad Lyubavitsh of Romania
