= Great Synagogue (Bucharest) =

Synagogue and Jewish museum, in Bucharest, Romania

- Romanian: Sinagoga Mare
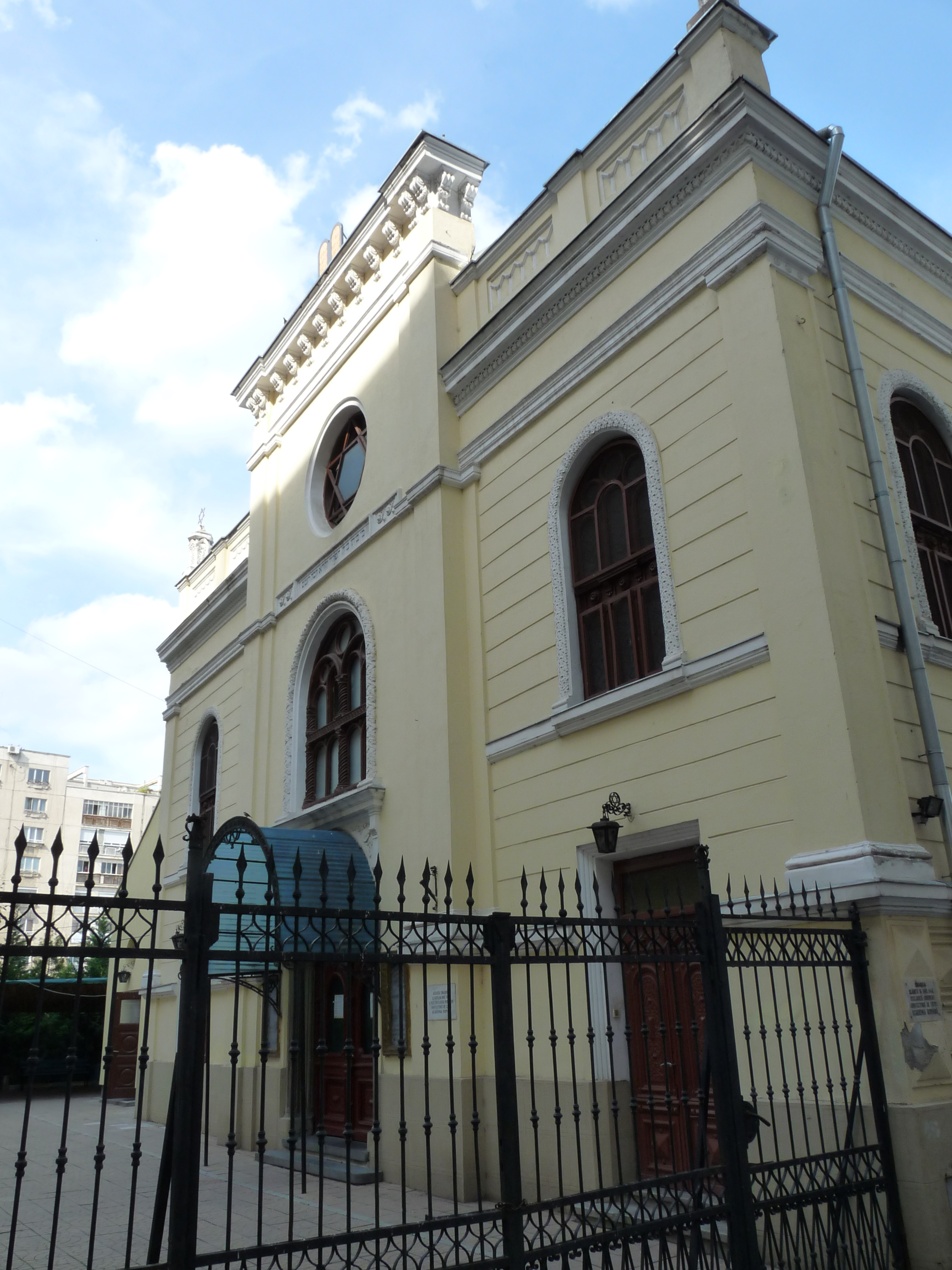
- The façade of the synagogue, in 2011

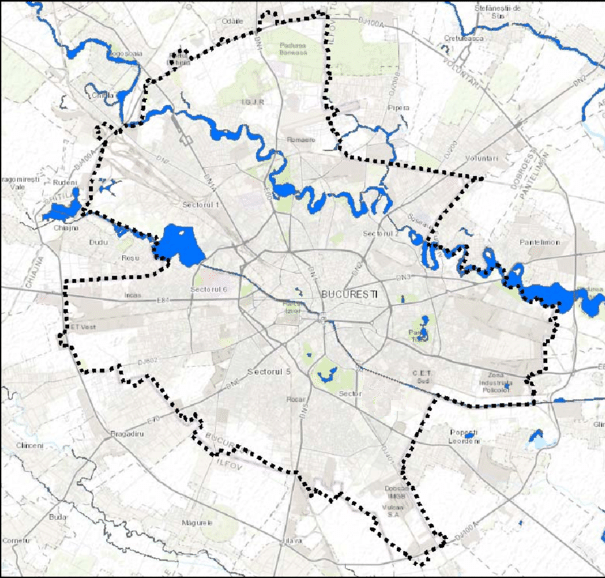
- Location of the synagogue and museum, in Bucharest

Religion
- Affiliation: Judaism
- Rite: Nusach Ashkenaz
- Ecclesiastical or organizational status: Synagogue (since 1847); Jewish museum (since YYYY)
- Status: Active (as a synagogue); Repurposed

Location
- Location: 11 Vasile Adamache Street, Bucharest
- Country: Romania
- Interactive map of Great Synagogue
- Coordinates: 44°25′46″N 26°06′31″E

Architecture
- Architects: Israil Herș (1847); Asher Ancel (1847); I.B. D'Alfonce de St. Omer (1903); Petre Antonescu (1909); Jean Locar (1932)
- Type: Synagogue architecture
- Style: Neoclassical
- Established: 1845 (as a congregation)
- Groundbreaking: 1846
- Completed: 1847
- Materials: Brick

The Great Synagogue (Romanian: Sinagoga Mare), also known as the Great Polish Synagogue, is a Jewish congregation and synagogue, located at 11 Vasile Adamache, in the Old Jewish District of Bucharest, Romania. The synagogue was completed in 1847 by the Polish-Jewish community. The building is also used as a Jewish museum.

== History ==
It was repaired in 1865, redesigned in 1903 and 1909, repainted in Rococo style in 1936 by Ghershon Horowitz, then it was restored again in 1945, as it had been devastated by the far-right Legionnaires.

It used to host weekend religious services. Dr. Moses Rosen was rabbi of the congregation.

== See also ==
- History of the Jews in Bucharest
- History of the Jews in Romania
- List of synagogues in Bucharest
- List of synagogues in Romania
- Legionnaires' rebellion and Bucharest pogrom
