= Faith Temple =

Synagogue in Bucharest, Romania

- Romanian: Templul Credința
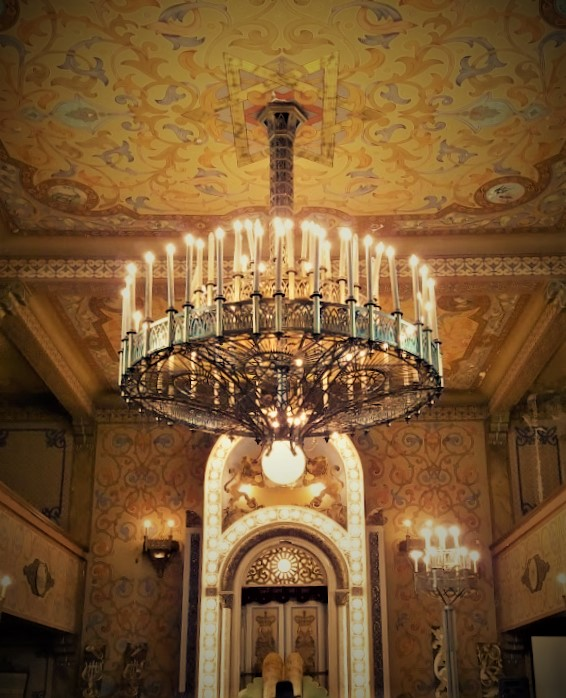
- The synagogue interior, in 1900

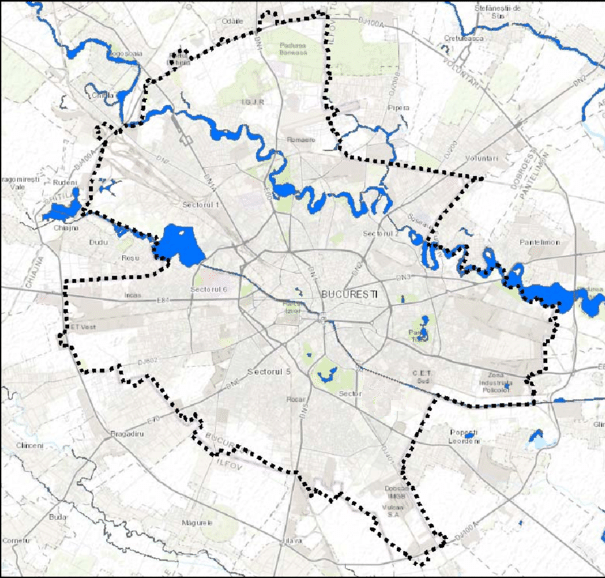
- Location of the synagogue in Bucharest

Religion
- Affiliation: Judaism
- Rite: Nusach Ashkenaz
- Ecclesiastical or organizational status: Synagogue
- Status: Active

Location
- Location: 48 Toneanu Vasile Street, Bucharest
- Country: Romania
- Interactive map of Faith Temple
- Coordinates: 44°25′13″N 26°07′40″E

Architecture
- Type: Synagogue architecture
- Style: International
- Completed: 1926
- Materials: Brick

The Faith Temple (Romanian: Templul Credința, or Romanian: Templul Hevrah Amuna, or Romanian: Sinagoga Credinta) is a Jewish congregation and synagogue, located at 48 Toneanu Vasile Street, in Bucharest, Romania. Designed in the International architectural style, the synagogue was completed in 1926.

== See also ==
- History of the Jews in Bucharest
- History of the Jews in Romania
- List of synagogues in Romania
- List of synagogues in Bucharest
