= Beth Hamidraș Temple =

Former synagogue in Bucharest, Romania

Beth Hamidraș Temple (Old Beit Hamidrash)
- Romanian: Beyth Homidraş Vechi
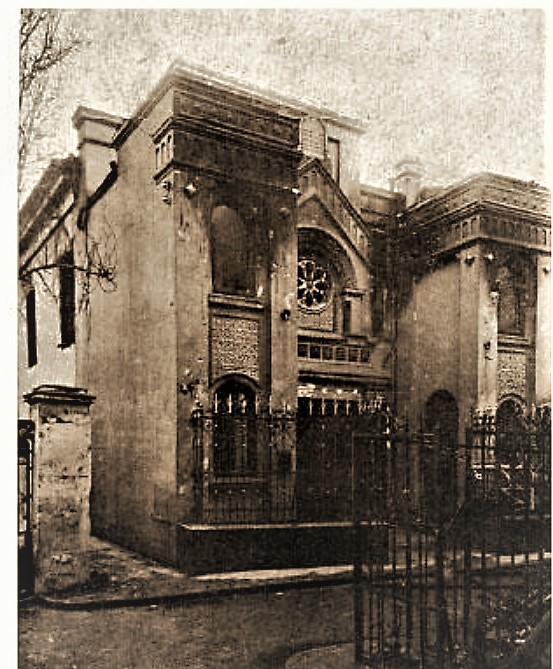
- The façade of the former synagogue, in 1941

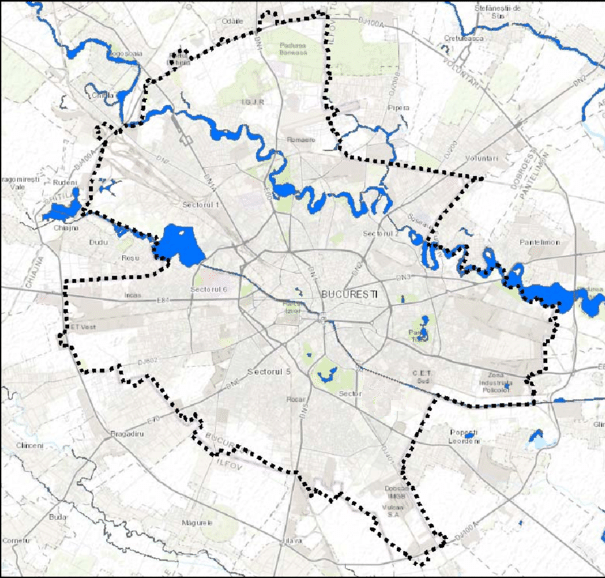
- Location of the former synagogue, in Bucharest

Religion
- Affiliation: Judaism (former)
- Rite: Nusach Ashkenaz
- Ecclesiastical or organizational status: Synagogue (1896– ????); Profane use (since ????)
- Status: Abandoned

Location
- Location: 78 Calea Moșilor, Bucharest
- Country: Romania
- Interactive map of Beth Hamidraș Temple (Old Beit Hamidrash)
- Coordinates: 44°25′56″N 26°06′23″E

Architecture
- Type: Synagogue architecture
- Style: Gothic Revival
- Established: 1781 (as a congregation)
- Completed: 1896
- Materials: Brick

The Beth Hamidraș Temple, also known as the Old Beit Hamidrash (Romanian: Beyth Homidraş Vechi), is a former Jewish congregation and synagogue, located at 78 Calea Moșilor, in the Old Jewish District of Bucharest, Romania. Designed in the Gothic Revival style, the synagogue was completed in 1896.

== History ==
Founded in 1781, the first wooden synagogue was completed in 1812, located in a building given by a Jewish woman; initially, it was named after her and her husband's name, Bet Hamidraș – Naftale and Taube Synagogue. The building was also known as the Bet Hamidraș Vechi (English: the Old Bet Hamidraș) or the Sinagoga de la Sfântu Gheorghe (English: the Synagogue at St. George). A replacement of the wooden synagogue was completed in 1896.

The synagogue was devastated by the far-right Legionaries in 1941. The building was "burnt while the believers were attending the religious service". It was burnt "when 23 faithful caught inside during the religious service were killed".

The synagogue was restored in 1947, however, the building has since been abandoned and repurposed as a warehouse.

== Gallery ==
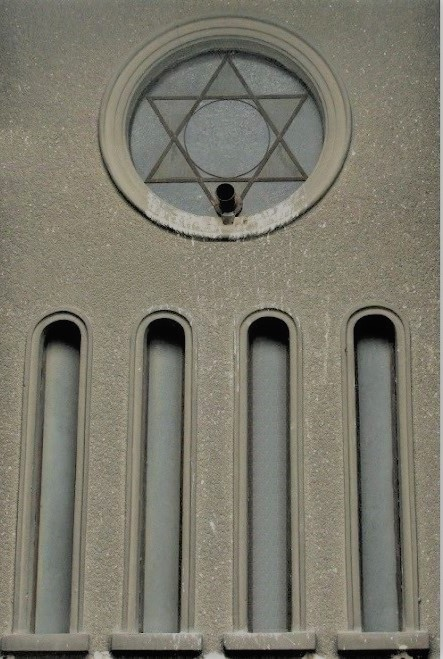
The former synagogue with Star of David, 2010

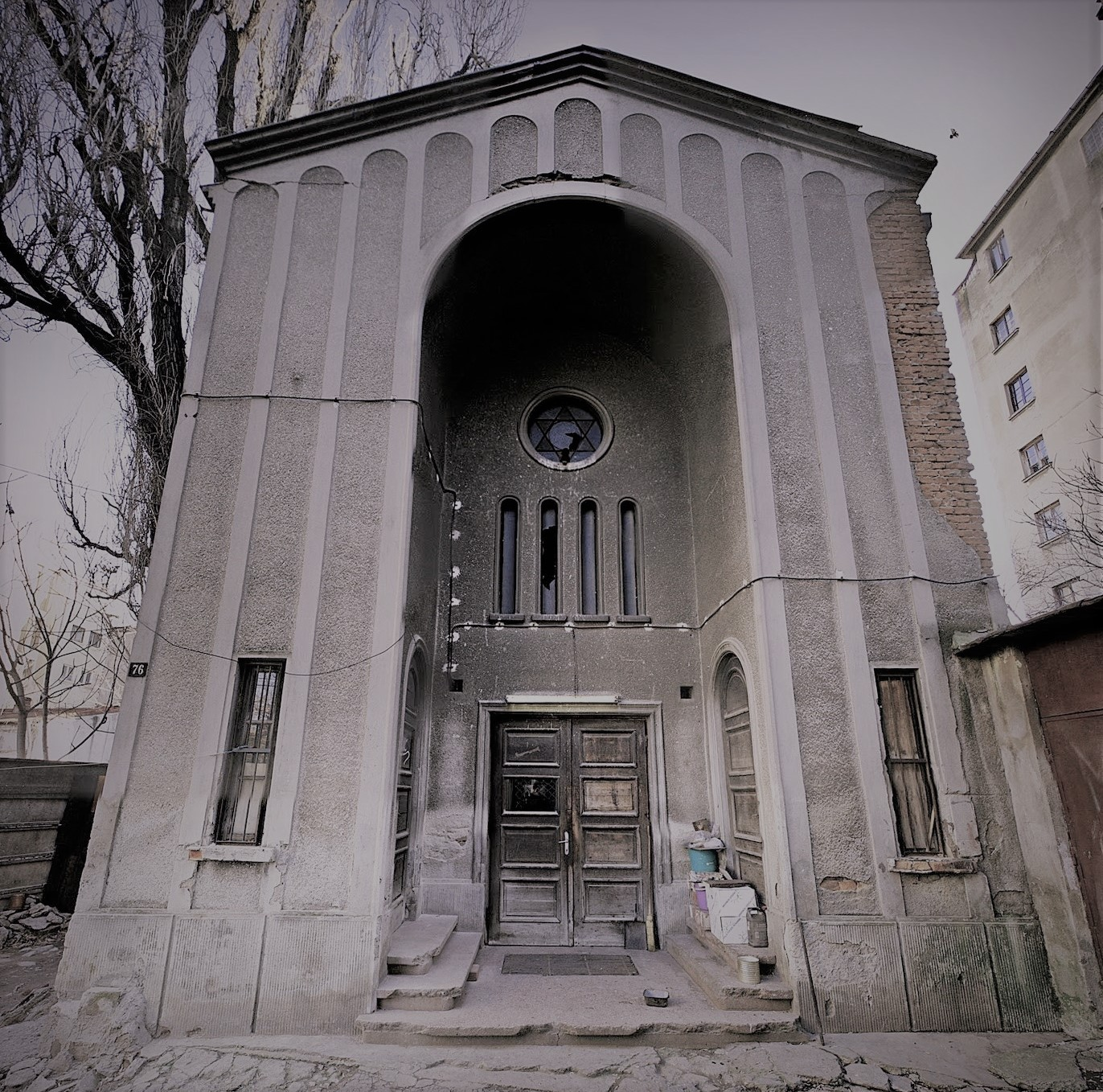
The former synagogue, 2011

== See also ==
- History of the Jews in Bucharest
- History of the Jews in Romania
- List of synagogues in Bucharest
- List of synagogues in Romania
- Legionnaires' rebellion and Bucharest pogrom
