= Grand Spanish Temple =

Demolished Orthodox synagogue in Bucharest, Romania

- Romanian: Templul Mare Spaniol
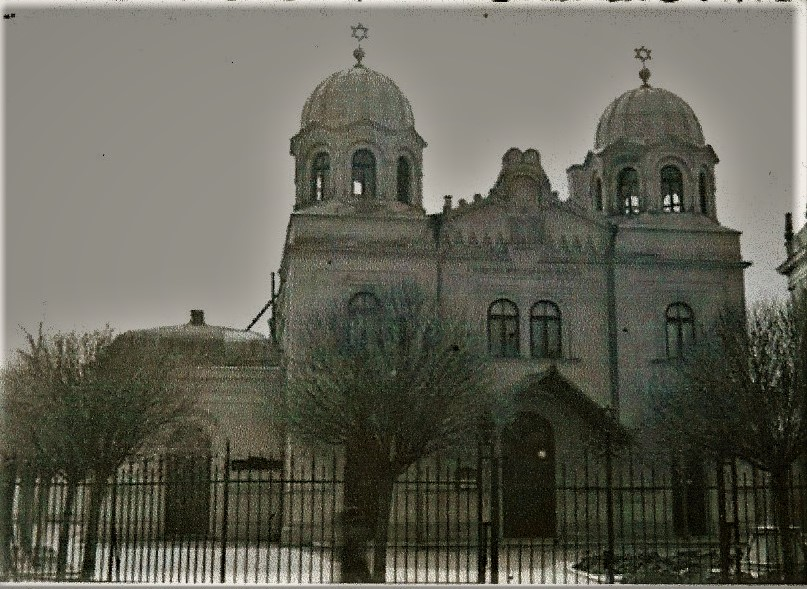
- The former synagogue façade, in 1940

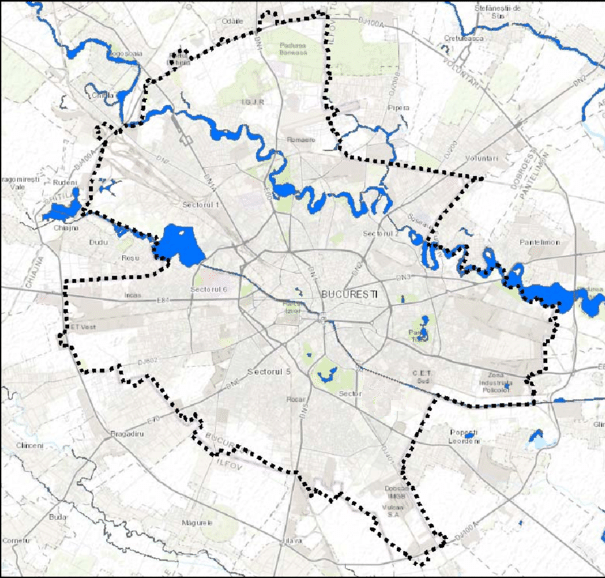
- Location of the former synagogue in Bucharest

Religion
- Affiliation: Orthodox Judaism (former)
- Rite: Nusach Sefard
- Ecclesiastical or organizational status: Synagogue (1818–1985)
- Status: Demolished

Location
- Location: 12 Negru Vodă Street, Văcărești, Bucharest
- Country: Romania
- Interactive map of Grand Spanish Temple
- Coordinates: 44°25′41″N 26°06′30″E

Architecture
- Type: Synagogue architecture
- Completed: 1818
- Demolished: 1985
- Materials: Brick

The Grand Spanish Temple (Romanian: Templul Mare Spaniol), also known as the Cahal Grande (Romanian: Marele templu sefard Cahal Grande), was a former Orthodox Jewish congregation and synagogue, located at 12 Negru Vodă Street, in the Văcărești district of Bucharest, Romania. The synagogue was completed in 1818 and demolished in 1985.

The building is believed to have been "one of the most beautiful Jewish buildings in Bucharest".

== History ==
The synagogue was built in 1818. The building was devastated by the far-right Legionaries in 1941. The synagogue was rebuilt after the war. However, in 1985 the building, along with the Malbim Synagogue and the Spanish Small Temple, was demolished to make room for the Union Boulevard in Bucharest.

== Gallery ==
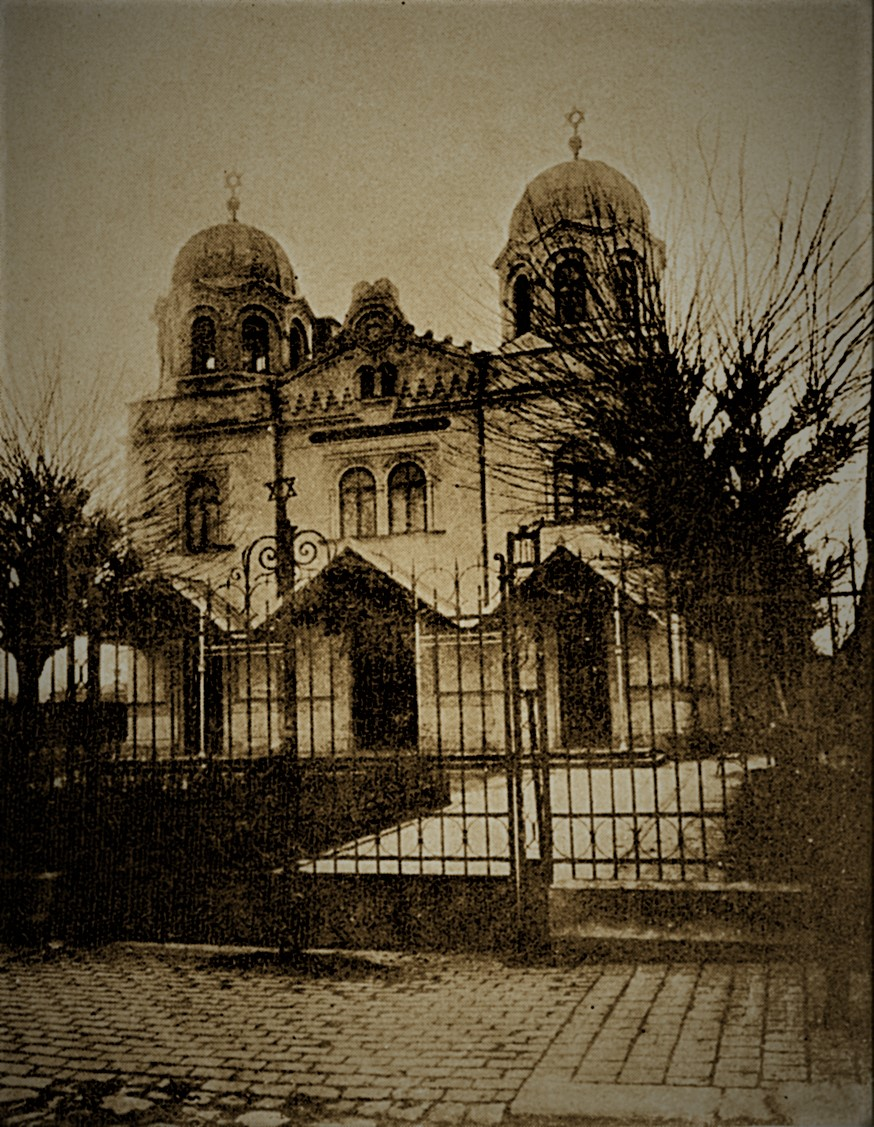
The synagogue exterior, 1900

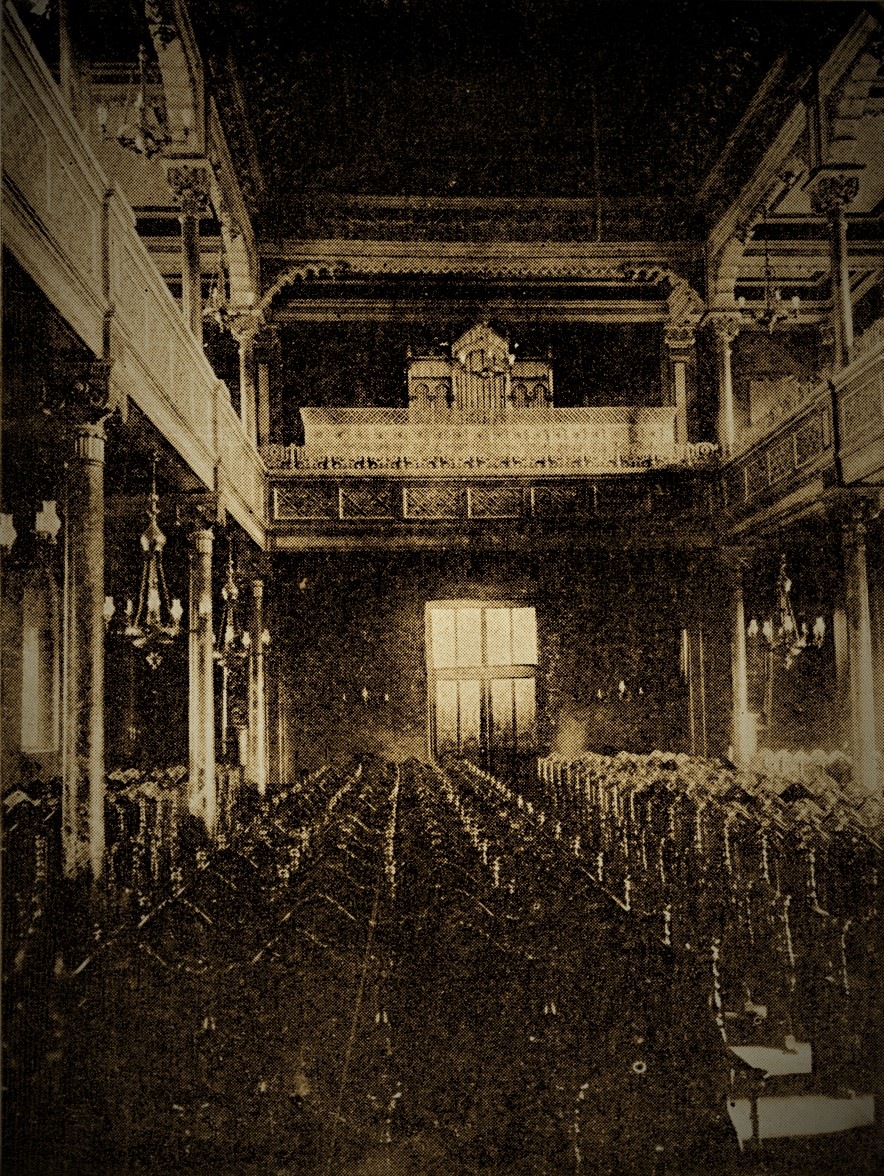
The synagogue interior, 1900

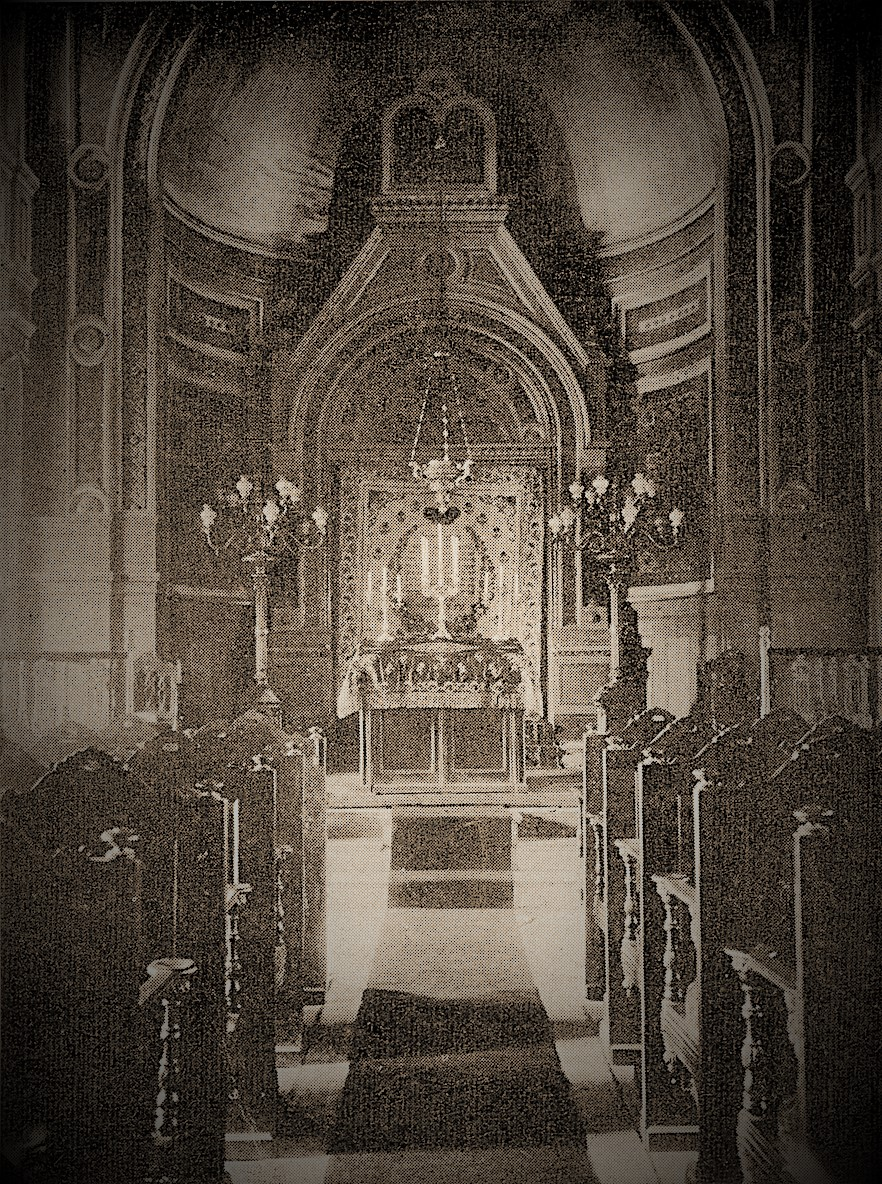
The synagogue interior, 1900

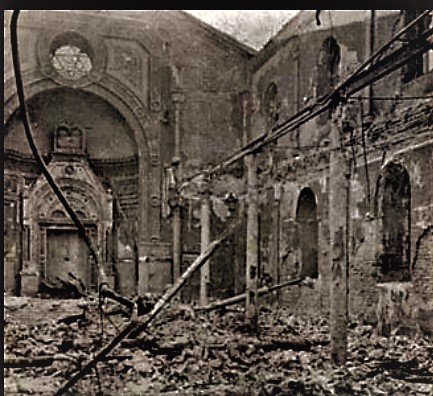
Ruins of the Sephardic Cahal Grande synagogue, burned by the Iron Guards during the coup, 1941

== See also ==
- History of the Jews in Bucharest
- History of the Jews in Romania
- List of synagogues in Bucharest
- List of synagogues in Romania
- Legionnaires' rebellion and Bucharest pogrom
