= Malbim Synagogue =

Demolished synagogue in Bucharest, Romania

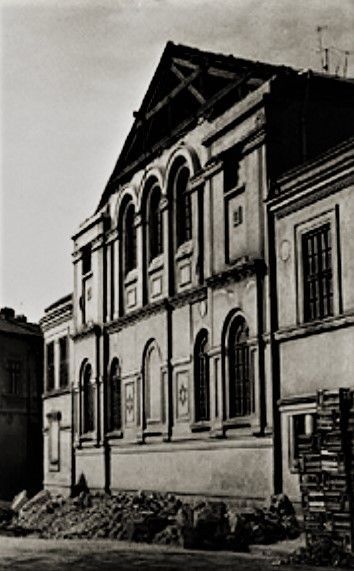
- The former synagogue façade, in 1941

Religion
- Affiliation: Judaism (former)
- Ecclesiastical or organizational status: Synagogue (1864–1987)
- Status: Demolished

Location
- Location: 4 Strada Bravilor, Bucharest
- Country: Romania

Architecture
- Type: Synagogue architecture
- Completed: 1864
- Demolished: 1987
- Materials: Brick

The Malbim Synagogue was a former Jewish congregation and synagogue, located at 4 Strada Bravilor, in Bucharest, Romania. The synagogue was completed in 1864 and demolished in 1987.

== History ==
The synagogue was built in 1864 upon the initiative of head rabbi Meir Leibush Wisser and reconstructed in 1912. The building was named after Rabbi Meir Leibish Malbim (1809-1879), being Chief Rabbi of Bucharest and Romania (1858-1864).

The building was devastated by the far-right Legionaries in 1941. The synagogue was rebuilt after World War II; however, in 1987, along with the Spanish Small Temple, the building was demolished to make room for the Union Boulevard in Bucharest.

== See also ==
- History of the Jews in Bucharest
- List of synagogues in Bucharest
- Legionnaires' rebellion and Bucharest pogrom
