= Choral Temple (Bucharest) =

Orthodox synagogue in Bucharest, Romania

- Romanian: Templul Coral
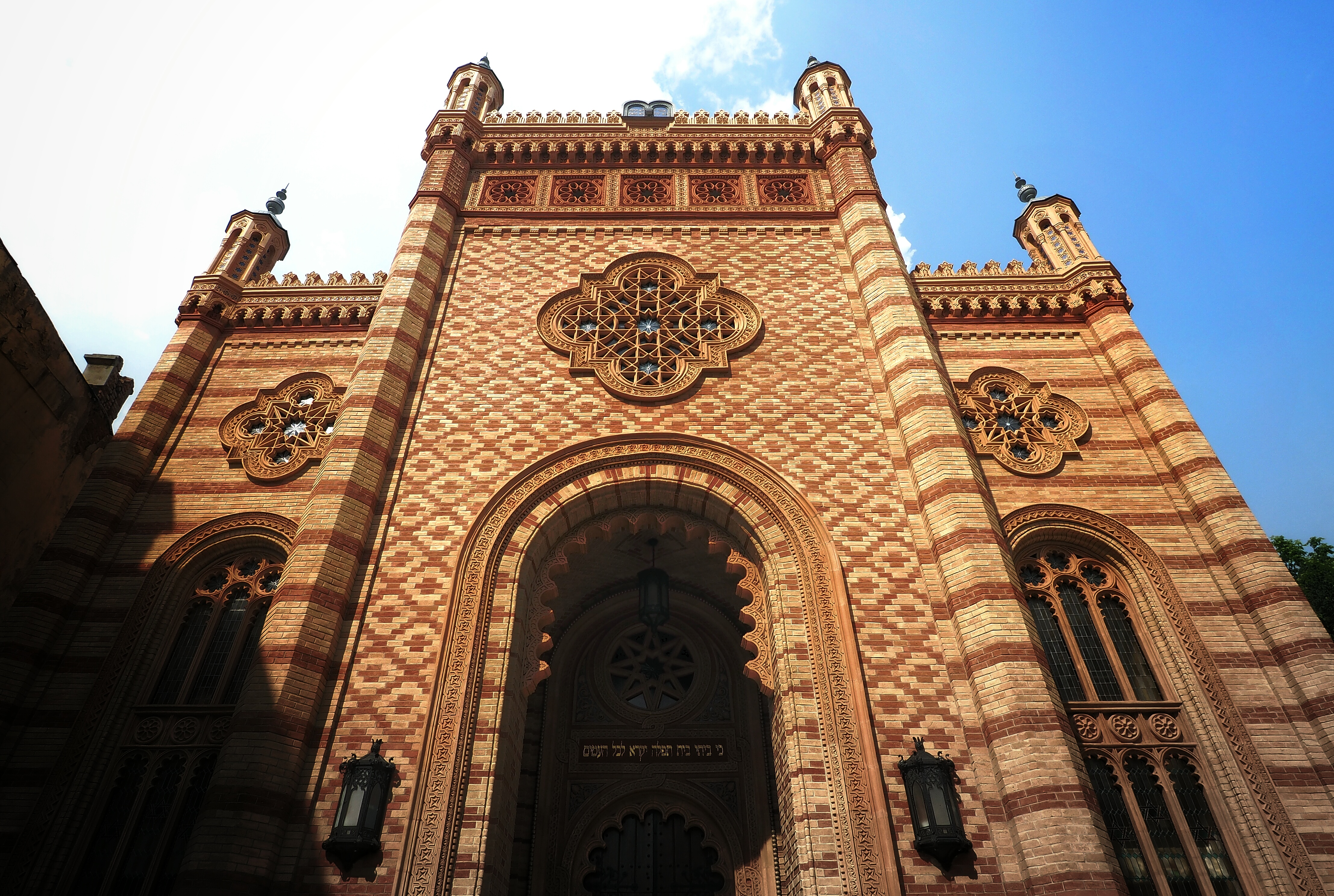
- The façade of the synagogue, in 2011

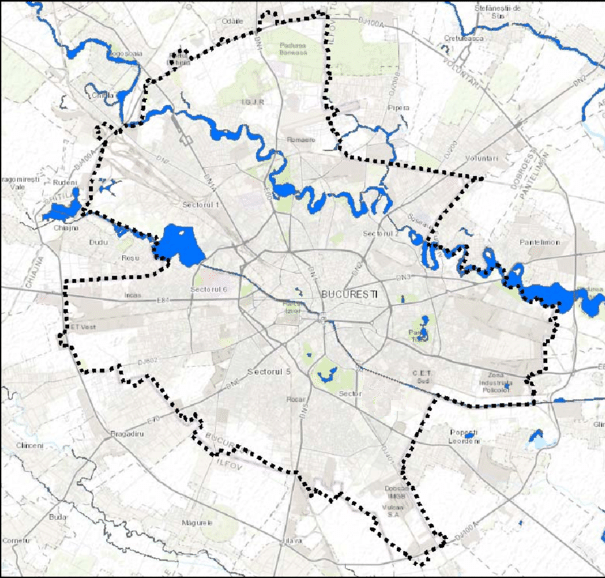
- Location of the synagogue in Bucharest

Religion
- Affiliation: Orthodox Judaism
- Rite: Nusach Ashkenaz
- Ecclesiastical or organizational status: Synagogue
- Status: Active

Location
- Location: 9-11 Sf. Vineri Street, Bucharest
- Country: Romania
- Interactive map of Choral Temple
- Coordinates: 44°25′52″N 26°06′24″E

Architecture
- Architects: I. Enderle (1866); Gustav Freiwald (1866); Iuliu Leoneanu (1932); Gregory Hirș (1932)
- Type: Synagogue architecture
- Style: Moorish Revival
- Groundbreaking: 1864
- Completed: 1866
- Materials: Brick

The Choral Temple (Romanian: Templul Coral) is an Orthodox Jewish congregation and synagogue, located at 9-11 Sf. Vineri Street, in Bucharest, Romania. Designed in the Moorish Revival style, the synagogue was completed in 1866.

== History ==
Designed by Enderle and Freiwald and built between 1864 and 1866, it is a very close copy of Vienna's Leopoldstadt-Tempelgasse Great Synagogue, which had been built in 1855–1858. The synagogue was devastated by the far-right Legionaries in January 1941, but was then restored after World War II, in 1945. The main hall was recently refurbished, and re-opened in 2015. The synagogue is still hosts daily religious services in the small hall, being one of the few active synagogues in the city and in Romania.

== See also ==
- History of the Jews in Bucharest
- History of the Jews in Romania
- List of synagogues in Bucharest
- List of synagogues in Romania
- Legionnaires' rebellion and Bucharest pogrom
