= Sephardic Jews in Hungary =

Jewish community in Hungary

Regions with significant populations
- Budapest

Languages
- Ladino, Hungarian

Religion
- Judaism

Related ethnic groups
- Sephardic Jews

The Sephardic Jews have lived in Hungary since the 16th century, when the Hungarian lands were incorporated into the Ottoman Empire. Under Ottoman rule, Sephardic Jews were an important part of the Jewish communities of Hungary and Transylvania. Buda (known as "Budon" by Sephardic Jews) is the historic center of the Sephardic community in Hungary. Hungarian Jews and Judaism were influenced by Sephardic culture due to Buda's role as a bridge between Western and Eastern Jewish communities.

== History ==
In comparison to the rest of Eastern Europe, where Eastern European Sephardim had a marginal presence, the Hungarian and Romanian lands had a more notable Sephardic presence. In addition to Buda, Sephardim also had communities in Eger and Kecskemét. Following the Battle of Mohács in 1526, the Eastern Hungarian Kingdom was under Turkish suzerainty and the central and southern regions of Hungary were under the rule of the Ottoman Empire. Ottoman Sephardim from Istanbul, Salonica, and Belgrade began to settle in Hungary. In 1580, of Buda's Jewish population of around 800 people, around one-third were Sephardic. After Ottoman rule ended in 1686 and 1690, many of the Hungarian Sephardim were subjected to rape, murder, and slavery. Most of the surviving Hungarian Sephardim returned to the Ottoman Empire. The majority of the remaining Sephardim were assimilated into Ashkenazi communities founded by waves of immigration from Austria, Bohemia, and Galicia.

== Notable Hungarian Sephardic Jews ==
- Meir Amigo, businessman

== See also ==
- Sephardic Jews in Romania
