= Jewish Museum (Bucharest) =

Museum and former synagogue in Bucharest, Romania

Coordinates: 44°25′42.57″N 26°6′29.12″E

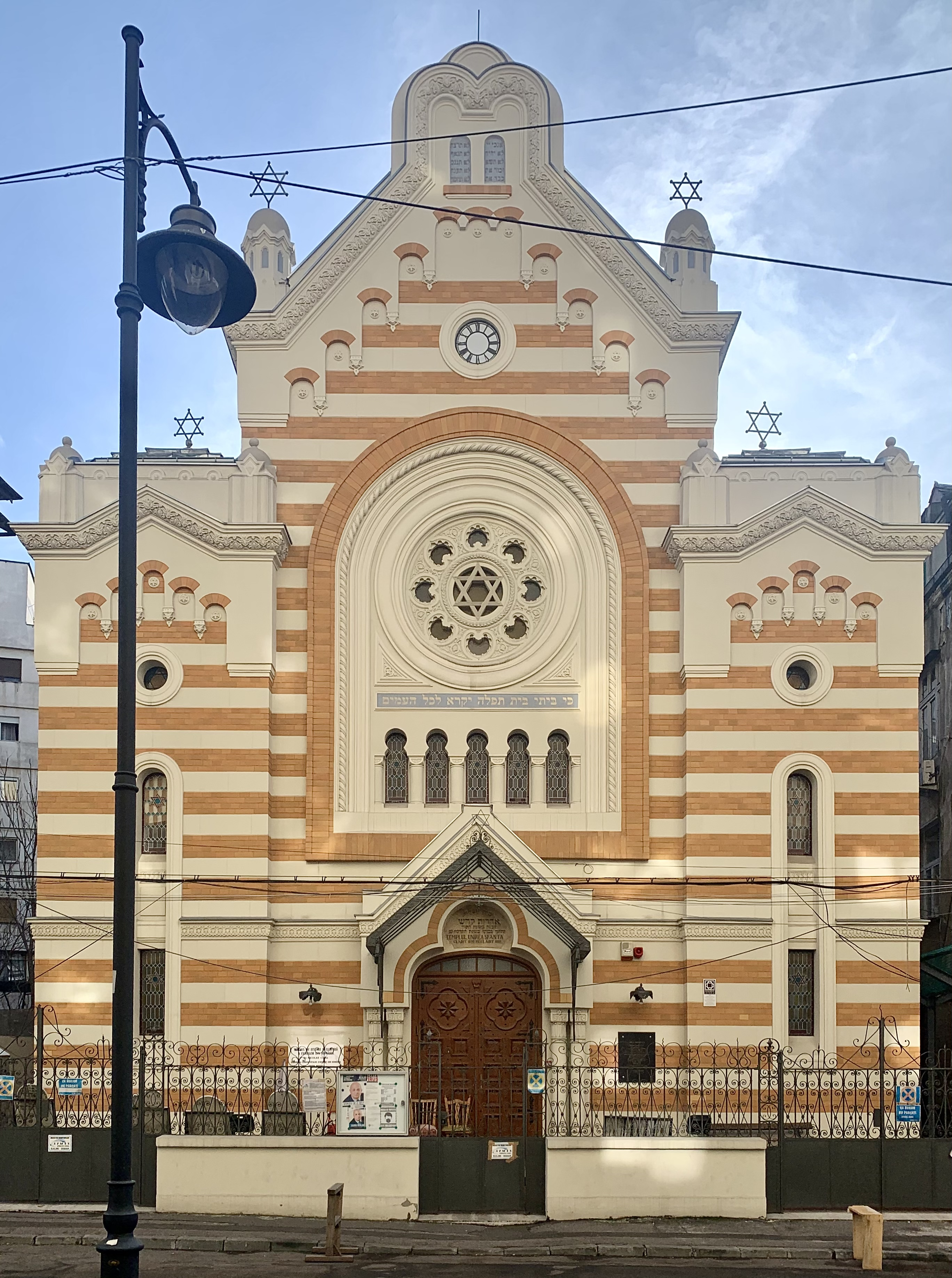
The museum

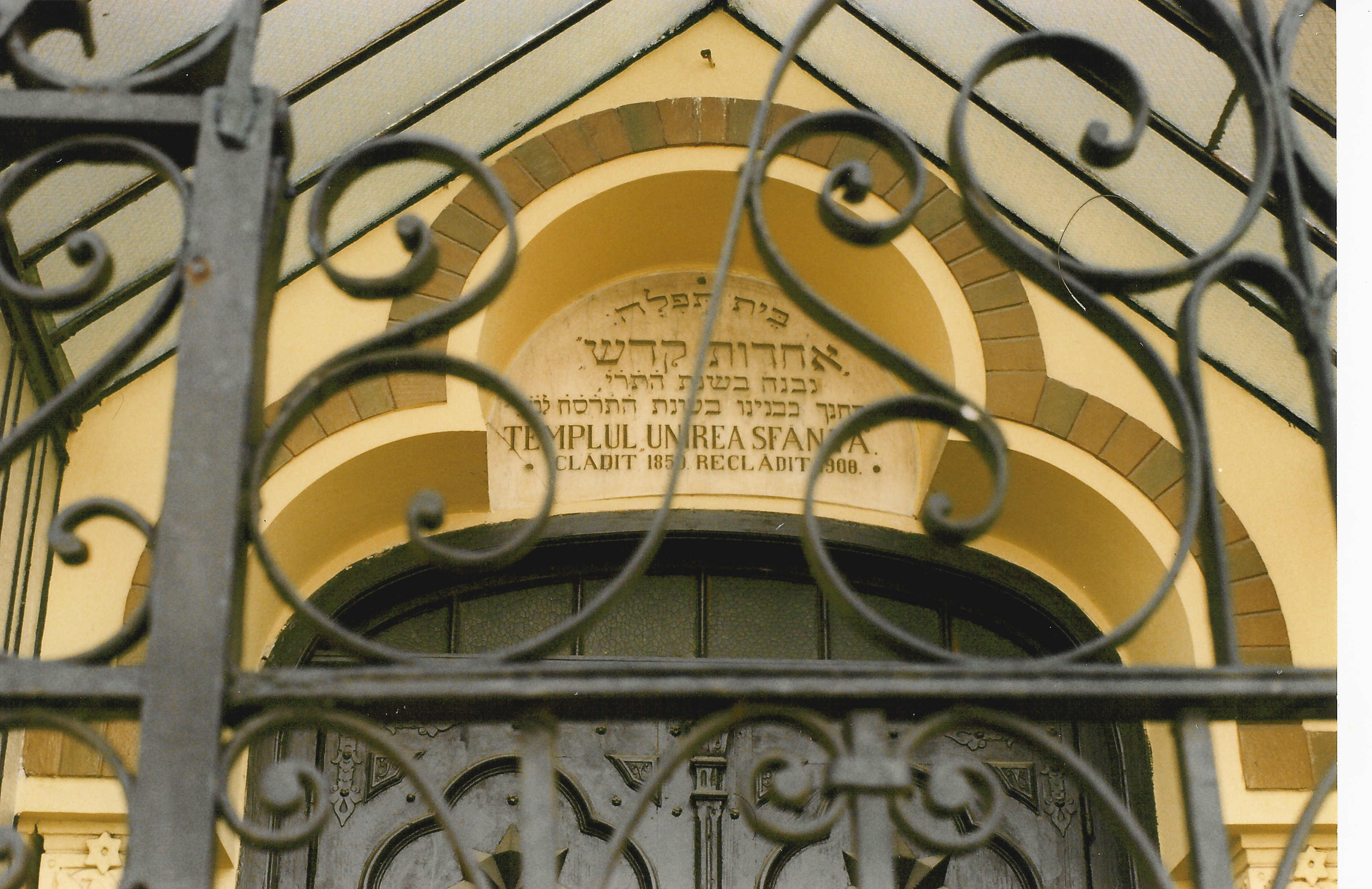
The inscription over the entrance

The Jewish Museum in Bucharest, Romania is located in the former Templul Unirea Sfântă (United Holy Temple) synagogue, which survived World War II.

The name has several variants, including Museum of the History of the Romanian Jewish Community. In Romanian it is variously called Muzeul de Istorie al Comunitatilor Evreiești din România, Muzeul de Istorie a Comunitații Evreiești București etc.

The museum gives broad coverage of the history of the Jews in Romania. Displays include an enormous collection of books written, published, illustrated, or translated by Romanian Jews; a serious archive of the history of Romanian Jewry; a collection of paintings of and by Romanian Jews that, while relatively small, consists of works of a calibre worthy of a major art museum (many of the same artists' works hang in the National Museum of Art); memorabilia from Jewish theaters including the State Jewish Theater; a medium-sized display devoted to Zionism; a small but pointed display of antisemitic posters and tracts; two rooms off to a side, one dealing with the Holocaust era from a historical point of view, the other a Holocaust memorial; discussion of both favorable and unfavorable treatment of the Jews by various of Romania's historic rulers; in short, a museum devoted to looking seriously at the history of a particular ethnic group within a society. In contrast to its Hungarian equivalent in Budapest, this is not a museum that sees the exodus of the majority of the country's surviving Jews to Israel as a culmination: this museum is focused more on what that means for those who have stayed, what is the continuing contribution of Jews to Romanian culture, what has been, what is, and what will be the role of Jews in Romania.

The Museum also contains a large collection of Jewish ritual objects from Romania, collected by Rabbi Moses Rosen (1912–1994), the late Chief Rabbi of the Romanian Jewry.

== See also ==
- History of the Jews in Romania
- List of synagogues in Romania
