= Moses Rosen =

Romanian rabbi

Rabbi Moses Rosen
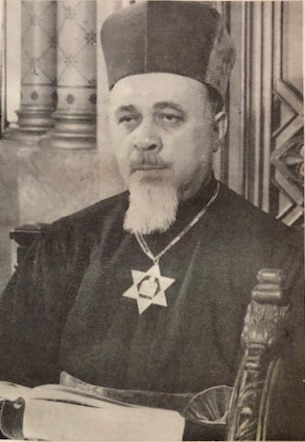
- Moses Rosen in 1971

Chief Rabbi of Romanian Jews
- In office 1948–1994

President of the Federation of Jewish Communities of Romania
- In office 1964–1994

Personal life
- Born: July 23, 1912 Moinești, Bacău, Romania
- Died: May 6, 1994 (aged 81) Bucharest, Romania
- Occupation: Rabbi

Religious life
- Religion: Judaism
- Denomination: Orthodox

Moses Rosen (known in Hebrew as David Moshe Rosen, דוד משה רוזן) (July 23, 1912 – May 6, 1994) was Chief Rabbi (Rav Kolel) of Romanian Jewry between 1948–1994 and president of the Federation of Jewish Communities of Romania between 1964 and 1994. He led the community through the entire Communist era in Romania and continued in that role after the restoration of democracy following the Romanian Revolution of 1989. In 1957, he became a deputy in the Romanian parliament (the Great National Assembly), a position he held through the Communist regime, and after 1989, in the democratic parliament. In the 1980s, the Romanian authorities allowed him to receive Israeli nationality and he was elected president of the Council of the Jewish Diaspora Museum in Tel Aviv.

== Family and youth ==
He was born on July 23, 1912, in the town of Moinești, in the district of Bacău, the son of a known rabbi, the rav gaon Avraham Arie Leib Rosen (1870–1951), of Galician origin. In 1916, his father became rabbi in another Moldavian town, Fălticeni and moved there with the whole family. He used to preach in the "Habad" synagogue and was one of the most esteemed rabbis. Through the mediation of his son-in-law, the rabbi dr Wolf (Zeev) Gottlieb from Glasgow, his responsa and other religious law works of him were edited and printed in Rav Kook Publishing House in Jerusalem (Shaagat Arié, Eitan Arie, 1912; Pirkei Shoshana, 1920). Moses Rosen lived in Fălticeni for at least part of his childhood. He learned Torah and Talmud with his father for many years, and studied at the local high school. Once, at age 14, after having expressed publicly his opinion against antisemitism, was arrested and judged for false Lèse majesté charges. He was granted amnesty after a month.

After having passed the state maturity exams in Dorohoi, in 1931 the young Moses Rosen entered the Law faculty in the University of Bucharest. But the antisemitic atmosphere, which dominated university life in the Romanian capital at that time, caused him to stop his law studies there and to continue them in Vienna. At the same time, he began his studies at the Viennese Rabbinical Seminary. For economic reasons, he had to return to Romania, and this time, despite hardships, he succeeded in finishing his studies at the Faculty of Law and got his license (Dr. Juris) in 1935. He then began his two-year military service in the town of Fălticeni, most of the time as military rabbi and confessor. In 1937, he returned to Vienna to resume his Rabbinical studies, where he learned with rabbi Alter Dorf (Gornik) who came from Sadagura. The Anschluss in May 1938 forced him to leave soon after. He returned to Romania, where he received his ordination in 1939, from some of the greatest rabbis of the country: Haim Rabinovici, Baruh Glanz, Moses Berger, members of the Rabbinical Council of Bucharest and from the chief rabbi of Romania, dr Jacob Itzhak Niemirower and the chief rabbi of Bucovina, dr. Abraham Jacob Mark.

== Activity as young rabbi in Romania ==
His first job as rabbi was in a small synagogue in the Mahala quarter of Fălticeni. Then, in May 1940 he was appointed rabbi in the town of Suceava. But, after September 6, 1940, when the Iron Guard or the Legionnaires, the Romanian extreme right, came to the power, Moses Rosen was arrested under the charge of being "Communist" and deported to an internment camp in Caracal, in the south of Romania. After several months, after the defeat of the Legionnaires rebellion by the forces loyal to the prime minister, the General Ion Antonescu, Rosen was discharged and fulfilled a part-time job as rabbi in two synagogues in Bucharest – "Reshit Daat" and "Beit El". Meanwhile, he also taught Talmud in a Jewish school. The entering of Romania in the war against the Soviet Union, as ally of Nazi Germany, brought more hardships to the Jewish population. Rosen had to hide in order to avoid deportation to Transnistria as a suspected "left wing" or "Bolshevik Jewish activist". After the coup of August 23, 1944, which brought Romania to abandon the alliance with Hitler and put an end to the Fascist-style antisemitic regime, the freedom for Jews was reestablished and Moses Rosen advanced on the steps of the rabbinical hierarchy in Bucharest. He became the head of the religion department of the Jewish community, was elected as member in the Rabbinate Council and as rabbi of the Great Synagogue of Bucharest (Sinagoga Mare).

== Election as Chief Rabbi of Romanian Jewry – 1948 ==
In December 1947 the much esteemed Romanian Chief Rabbi in office, Dr Alexandru Șafran, was deported from Romania by the new Communist leadership of the country, which was installed under the pressure of the Soviet occupation force. Rabbi Şafran was considered too close to the Royal family and to the old "bourgeois" leadership of the Romanian Jews (the Union of Romanian Jews, dr Wilhelm Filderman, the Zionist representatives and others) which was hated by the new government. He was ordered to leave Romania within 2–3 hours. The Communist party, which meanwhile changed its name to "Romanian Workers Party" (Partidul Muncitoresc Român) imposed on the Jews a new ethnic organization called the Jewish Democratic Committee, somehow an imitation of the former Yevsektsiya from Soviet Russia. Under the supervision of the Jewish Democratic Committee, the rabbis and the communities representatives from all around Romania met in Bucharest on June 16, 1948, and elected by secret vote Dr Moses Rosen as the new Chief Rabbi instead of Alexandru Şafran who was accused as a traitor who "abandoned" his "sheep and goats".

The rival of Moses Rosen in this election was Dr David Şafran, a nephew of the former chief rabbi, known as fervent Zionist activist. Following the item written on the scrap of paper he had pulled out, David Şafran had to give a sample of sermon about the fight for peace on basis of a week pericope from the Torah. At his turn, following the same procedure, Moses Rosen was demanded to preach at the inauguration of a craftsmen cooperative on basis of other pericope. On June 20, 1948, Moses Rosen, as winner of the contest, was installed as "Rav Kolel" in Romania, at a ceremony in the Choral Temple, in the presence of many officials, among them the vice-president of the Great National Assembly (the Romanian parliament under the communist regime), Ştefan Voitec and the minister of religious affairs, Stanciu Stoian. Rabbi David Şafran became a victim of the Communist terror, persecuted and imprisoned for several years for his Zionist convictions. After his liberation, he was allowed in the end to emigrate to Israel, where he wrote many books, in many of them giving a very negative opinion about Moses Rosen, the "Red rabbi" ("Rabinul roşu").

== Leader of Judaism in Romania in the years of Stalinism ==
As leader of the Jewish religious institutions, Rabbi Rosen was submitted to the control of the Communist authorities which in the 1950s ran a very harsh policy against expressions of Jewish national feeling, especially Zionism, Hebrew culture and Jewish religion. There was some tolerance, but mostly limited to the culture in the Yiddish language. Openly opposing the regime, which used Stalinist terror methods, would have attracted cruel individual and collective repression and revenge measures.

After having been allowed during June 27 – July 6, 1948, to take part in the meeting of the World Jewish Congress in Montreux, Switzerland, following Moscow's directives, the Romanian communist regime disconnected totally the Jews of Romania from the other Jewish communities in the world for a period of eight years. In those difficult circumstances the diplomatic mission in Bucharest of the newly founded Jewish state of Israel remained active.

In 1948, the Rabbinical Council of Romanian Jews led by Moses Rosen was coerced to sign a declaration of condemnation of the so-called "Zionist activity" of the former Chief Rabbi Dr. Alexandru Şafran, who was meanwhile elected Chief Rabbi of Geneva. Nevertheless, despite his formal membership in the Jewish Democratic Committee, Moses Rosen tried to keep a distance from the policy of the leaders of the Committee (Bercu Feldman, H. Leibovici-Şerban, Israel Bacalu etc.) who desired to encourage a Jewish secular culture in Yiddish on account of the Hebrew religious and secular one, to satisfy the ideology of the Communist regime. The reserved attitude of Moses Rosen vis-a-vis the political and cultural line of the Jewish Democratic Committee proved to be the right diplomacy. In March 1953, the regime, again inspired by Moscow, decided to rid itself from the Committee and led to its "voluntary" dissolution. The press organ of the Committee, "Unirea" was closed.

After Stalin's death and later, after the beginning of de-Stalinization in USSR, the Communist authorities in Romania decided to use the good offices of the leaderships of the different religious faiths in Romania, including those of religious minorities, in order to improve their image in the world and to improve Romania's economic relations with other countries.

In 1956, the year when many of the Zionist activists were freed from the Romanian prisons, the authorities allowed Rabbi Rosen to take part again in Jewish meetings and conferences abroad. The first occasion was the contact with the Chief Rabbi of Sweden, Kurt Wilhelm. The same year, in October 1956, Rosen was authorized to found "Revista Cultului Mozaic" (The Mosaic Cult Review), official press organ of the Romanian Jewry, published in Romanian, Yiddish and Hebrew. It was the sole Hebrew periodical regularly printed in the entire communist world, for over 30 years. The prestigious scholar Ezra Fleischer former Romanian Prisoner of Zion, and Israel Prize winner, was one of the first editors of the journal, before his emigration to Israel.

Since 1957, Chief Rabbi Rosen, following a renewed tradition existing during the pre-Fascist epoch, was elected member of the Romanian Parliament, representing a Bucharest constituency (then still with a rather large Jewish population).

== Activity and leadership in the years 1960s–1980s ==
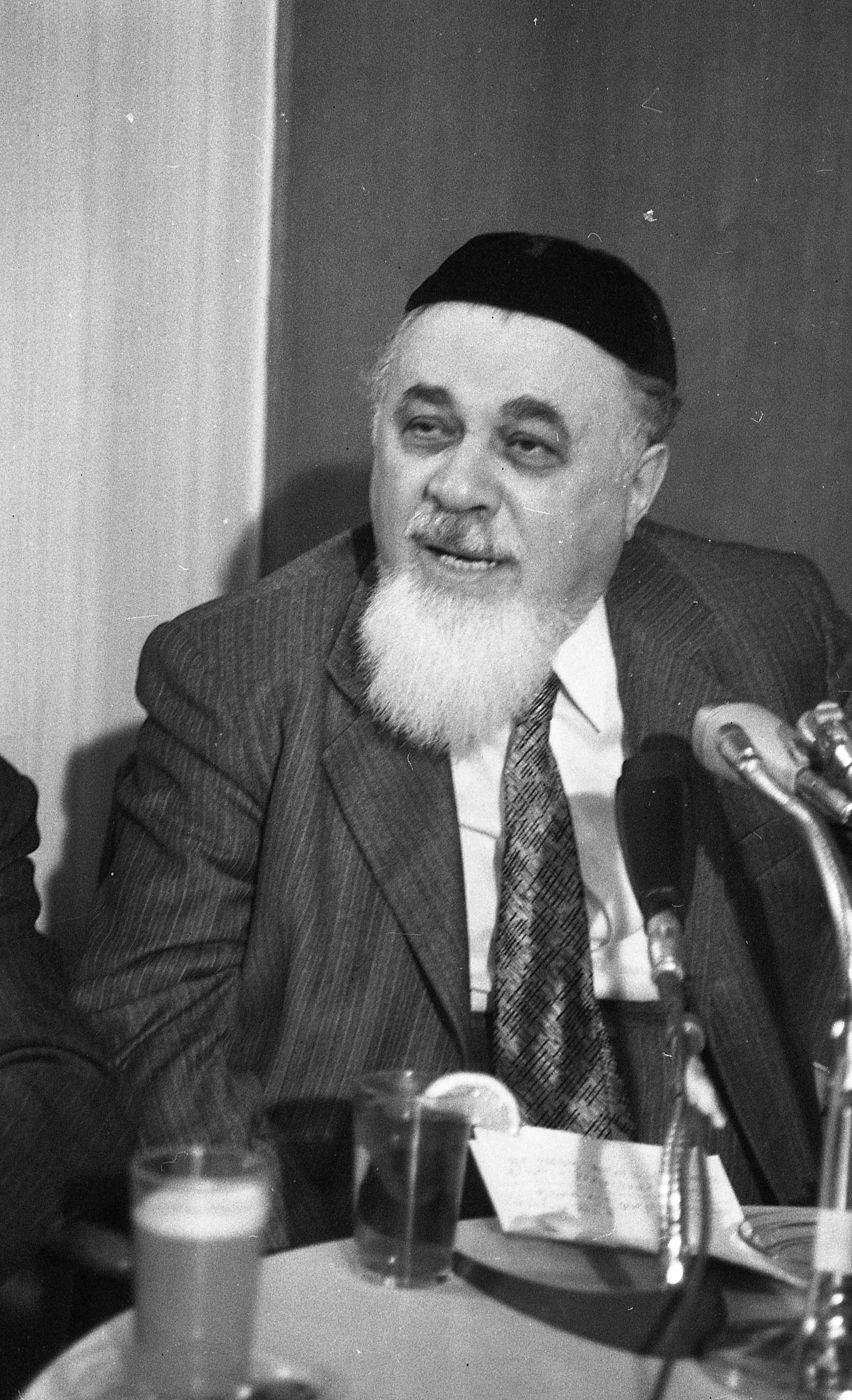
Moshe Rosen lecturing on the status of Jews in Romania, 1979

In 1964 the Chief Rabbi Moses Rosen added to his functions that of the chairman of the Federation of the Jewish Communities of Romania and kept it until his death.

The position of Rabbi Rosen got strengthened following the change in the Romanian foreign policy after 1964. The regime of Gheorghe Gheorghiu-Dej in his last days and then the new Romanian Communist leaders, Nicolae Ceaușescu and Ion Gheorghe Maurer were interested in increasing the independence of their country from Soviet Union, and to develop good relations with the West.

After the big waves of Jewish emigration permitted by the Communist Party in the years 1947–1952 and again in the first years of the 1960s, approximately 40,000 Jews have remained in Romania (in 1956 they were 146,000 as per the official census). The Ceauşescu regime decided to strengthen Romania's relations with Israel and with the Jewish communities of the world, especially the United States in order to benefit economically and politically. In fact, even earlier, since the 1950s Israel and western Jewish organizations were ready to help economically the Romanian state for the opening of the emigration gates. This time, during the 1970s and 1980s, they were also allowed to help the local Jewish communal life. With the authorization of the regime and with the help (after 1967) of the Joint Distribution Committee an entire network of institution was founded, such as old-age homes, kosher canteens, medical and social assistance to ill and needy. A Jewish cultural life also flourished, with summer camps for the Jewish youth, Talmud Torah and Hebrew language courses, series of concerts and lectures on Jewish themes.

In 1979 he founded, again with the permission of the Romanian regime, the Museum of the history of the Romanian Jews, in the building of "Unirea Sfântă" Jewish Temple in Bucharest.

The activity of Rabbi Rosen in those years, with the silent approval of the regime, from encouraging the emigration to Israel, to the study of the Hebrew language and Jewish traditions and values, to managing the social work network for the Jewish population, won esteem among the Jewish leaders in the world, who praised him for his leadership and diplomatic abilities.

On one occasion, the chief rabbi of England, Sir Immanuel Jakobowitz expressed his enthusiastic admiration for Rosen's achievements.

Rabbi Rosen, who always felt like a proud Jew, while still being well acquainted with Romanian culture, became one of Romania's non-official "ambassadors" on the international scene. (As did other minority religious leaders, for example the Muslim mufti of the Romanian Turks and Tatars, Yakub Mehmet who became one of his country's speakers during his visits in Arab and Muslim countries)

In the 1970s he participated in the efforts of the Bucharest regime to obtain the status of Most favoured nation for Romania's trade relations with the USA.

In March 1979, Rabbi Rosen and Patriarch Justinian, head of the Romanian Orthodox Church, jointly sponsored a Jewish and Orthodox Christian Dialogue in Lucerne, Switzerland. In the same spirit, he maintained very good relations with the Armenian bishop of Bucharest, who later became the Patriarch Catholicos of Armenia, Vazgen I. A public square in Jerusalem is named after Rabbi Rosen and his wife Amalia.

== Criticism of his relationship with Communist authorities ==
According to Elvira Groezinger, in the Stalinist era, Rabbi Rosen's articles in the Yiddish-language weekly IKUF-Bleter showed him to be "one of the staunchest leaders of the anti-Zionist and anti-Israel campaigns, and one who praised the Romanian Communist leaders."

Hadassah magazine wrote in 2000 of the "alliance" between Rosen and Nicolae Ceauşescu, "From Rosen's viewpoint, anything he could do to help Romania's Jews was legitimate. So he became as close to Ceauşescu as he could-in the name of preserving Jewish life in Romania and keeping the exit doors open. After the Six-Day War Romania did not break diplomatic relations with Israel. In return Rosen praised Ceauşescu in the West, undoubtedly contributing to the Romanian chief's reputation as a benign Communist leader. What didn't become clear until later was that he [Ceauşescu] was extorting a princely sum for his leniency toward the Jews."

In this connection Rabbi Rosen, in his short 1987 piece "The Recipe", quoted Charles de Gaulle: "I have no enemies, I have no friends, I have interests," and added "I succeeded in convincing the Romanian Government that, by doing good to the Jews, by meting out justice to them, it could obtain advantages in matters of favourable public opinion, trade relations, political sympathies... The 'business transaction' was profitable to both sides." Millions of Jews, he wrote, were living "in Eastern Europe, in a socialist society. No matter if one likes this or not, it represents a reality... Can they, somehow remain Jewish? The answer given by the past 40 years of the life led by a Jewish community in socialist Romania is categorical and irrefutable. Yes, indeed. They can. "Our 'balance-sheet' proves that, without making any noise, demonstrations or rows, we have succeeded in making Romania's interests correspond to ours..." He also wrote proudly of the fact the Jews who had left Romania had overwhelmingly made aliyah to Israel: "More than 90 per cent of the Romanian Jews reached Lod. They did not 'lose their way' heading for other continents..."

In the 1980s in his opposition to antisemitism and xenophobic trends which were sometimes encouraged by Ceauşescu himself, Rabbi Rosen dared to raise his voice even against some protégés of the regime, like the poet Corneliu Vadim Tudor, the writer Eugen Barbu and the literary historian Dumitru Vatamaniuc who edited posthumously, and without adequate critic notes, some controversial articles of the Romanian national great poet, Mihai Eminescu which were not favorable towards Jewish people.

== After the 1989 Revolution ==
After the Romanian Revolution of 1989, Rabbi Rosen was a harsh critic of the efforts to rehabilitate the image of Ion Antonescu, Romania's leader during the period when it had been allied with the Axis powers during World War II, and continued to advocate emigration to Israel: "Demagogy is very strong here... Neofascist propaganda... plays on xenophobia. Jews are a very easy scapegoat... I advise every Jew who can do so, to go to Israel."

In 1992, he became an honorary member of the Romanian Academy.

Rabbi Rosen was married since 1949 to Amalia, born Ruckenstein, from Burdujeni-Suceava. The couple had no children.

His elder half-brother (from the first marriage of his father) Eliyahu Rosen, was rabbi of the Jews in the Polish town of Oświęcim (Auschwitz) and perished in the Holocaust with his family and whole community. Moses Rosen's sister, Betty Bracha Rosen married the future chief rabbi of Scotland, the scholar Zeev Wolf Gottlieb.

== Sources ==
- Collection of "Revista Cultului Mozaic"
- Dalinger, Brigitte, English-language review of Groezinger, Elvira Die jiddische Kultur im Schatten der Diktaturen—Israil Bercovici (2003, in German), Philo, ISBN 3-8257-0313-4.

== See also ==
- List of Romanian Jews

== Bibliography ==
- Maja Wassermann: Gefahren, Versuchungen, Wunder. Zu einem Erinnerungsband von Oberrabbiner Dr. Moses Rosen. In: David. Jüdische Kulturzeitschrift (Viena), an. 5, nr. 16, 4/1993, pag. 25.
- Claus Stephani: Der Holocaust begann in Rumänien. „Eine Kerze, die in diesem Land langsam erlischt“. Gespräch mit Dr. Moses Rosen, dem Oberrabbiner Rumäniens. In: Jüdische Zeitung (Munich), an. 7, nr. 4/5, 10.5.1991, pag. 3–4.
- Claus Stephani: Oberrabbiner Moses Rosen spricht in Bukarest von einer bedauerlichen Identifikation der Rumänen mit Hitler / Potentielle Mörder warten auf ihre Chance. „Die systematische Vernichtung der Ostjuden begann in Rumänien.“ Ein Mahnmal im Hof des Tempels für 300.000 jüdische Opfer des Antonescu-Regimes. In: Allgemeine Jüdische Wochenzeitung (Bonn), nr. 46/23, 6.6.1991, pag. 11.
- Claus Stephani: Erwachen nach einem halben Jahrhundert. Ein Volk wird mit seinen Verbrechen konfrontiert / Gedenken an die Opfer des rumänischen Holocaust / Rechtsextremisten im Kommen. In: Jüdische Zeitung (Munich), an. 7, nr. 6/91, 25.7.1991, pag. 3.
- Rabbi Meir Wunder: Entziklopedia shel hakhmey Galitzia, Makhon leHantzahat Yahadut Galitzia, Yerushaliyim, 1990 (ebraică) (Enciclopedia rabinilor și învățaților evrei din Galiția, Institutul memorial al iudaismului din Galiția, vol.4, Ierusalim, 1990).
- Claus Stephani: “Den Ganef vor die Tir stellen”. Ein Gespräch mit Dr. Moses Rosen, Oberrabbiner von Rumänien. In: Neuer Weg (Bucharest), an. 42, nr. 12673, 3.3.1990, pag. 1–2.

Preceded by Alexandru Safran	Chief Rabbi of Romania; 1948–1994	Succeeded by Menachem Hacohen
