= Spanish Small Temple =

Demolished synagogue in Bucharest, Romania

- Romanian: Templul Mic Spaniol
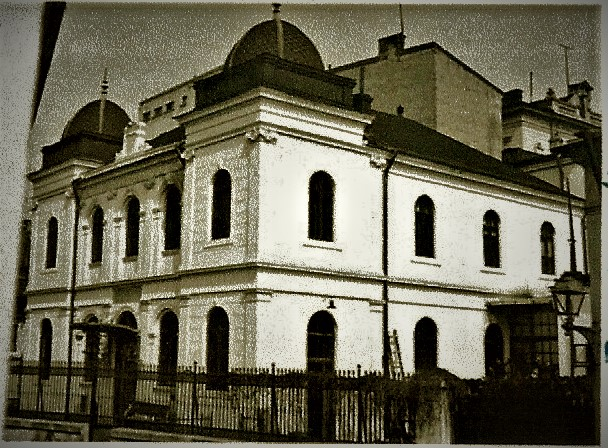
- The former synagogue façade, in 1900

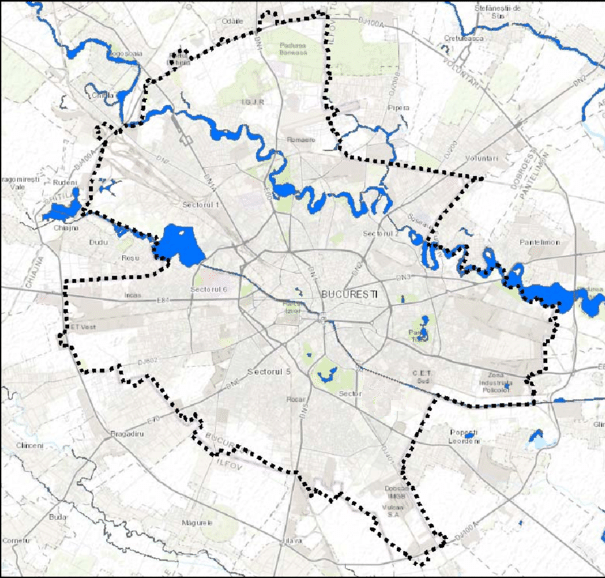
- Location of the former synagogue in Bucharest

Religion
- Affiliation: Judaism (former)
- Rite: Nusach Hasefaradim
- Ecclesiastical or organizational status: Synagogue (1846–1986)
- Status: Demolished

Location
- Location: 37 Banu Maracine Street, Bucharest
- Country: Romania
- Interactive map of Spanish Small Temple
- Coordinates: 44°25′38″N 26°06′17″E

Architecture
- Type: Synagogue architecture
- Completed: 1846
- Demolished: 1986
- Materials: Brick

The Spanish Small Temple (Romanian: Templul Mic Spaniol), also known as the Ca'al Cicu, was a former Jewish congregation and synagogue, located at 37 Banu Maracine Street, in Bucharest, Romania. The synagogue was completed in 1846 and demolished in 1986.

== History ==
The building was devastated by the far-right Legionaries in 1941. The synagogue was rebuilt after World War II; however, in 1986, along with the Malbim Synagogue and other synagogues, and many other houses, including historical Christian churches, the building was demolished to make room for the Union Boulevard in Bucharest.

== See also ==
- History of the Jews in Bucharest
- History of the Jews in Romania
- List of synagogues in Romania
- List of synagogues in Bucharest
- Legionnaires' rebellion and Bucharest pogrom
