= History of the Jews in Bucharest =

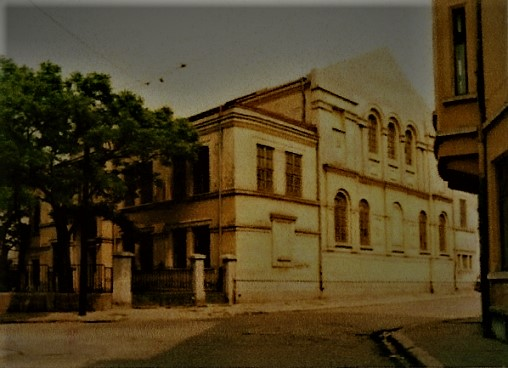
Malbim Synagogue, 1900

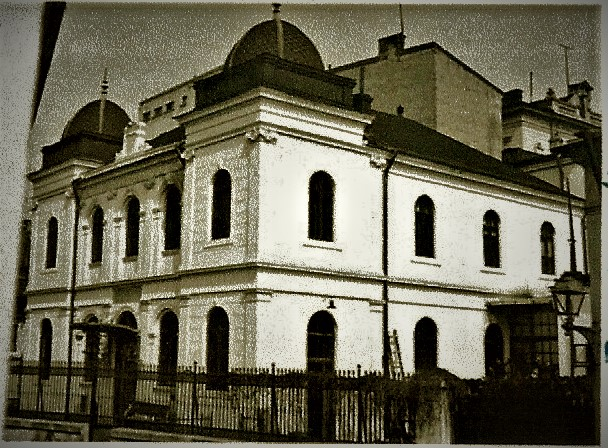
Spanish Small Temple, 1900

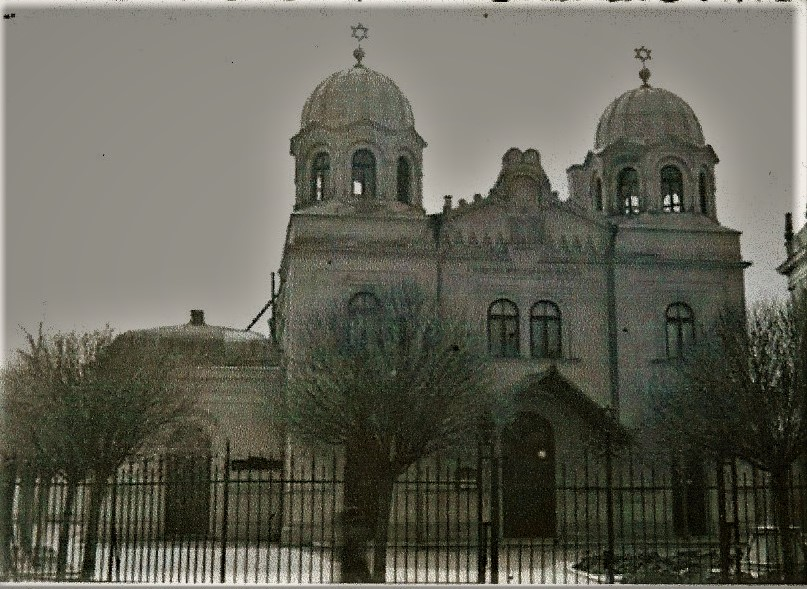
Grand Spanish Temple, 1940

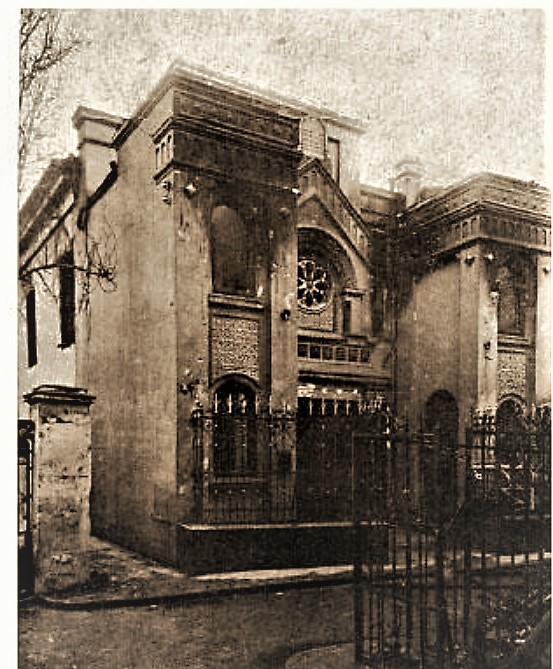
Beth Hamidraș Temple, January 1941

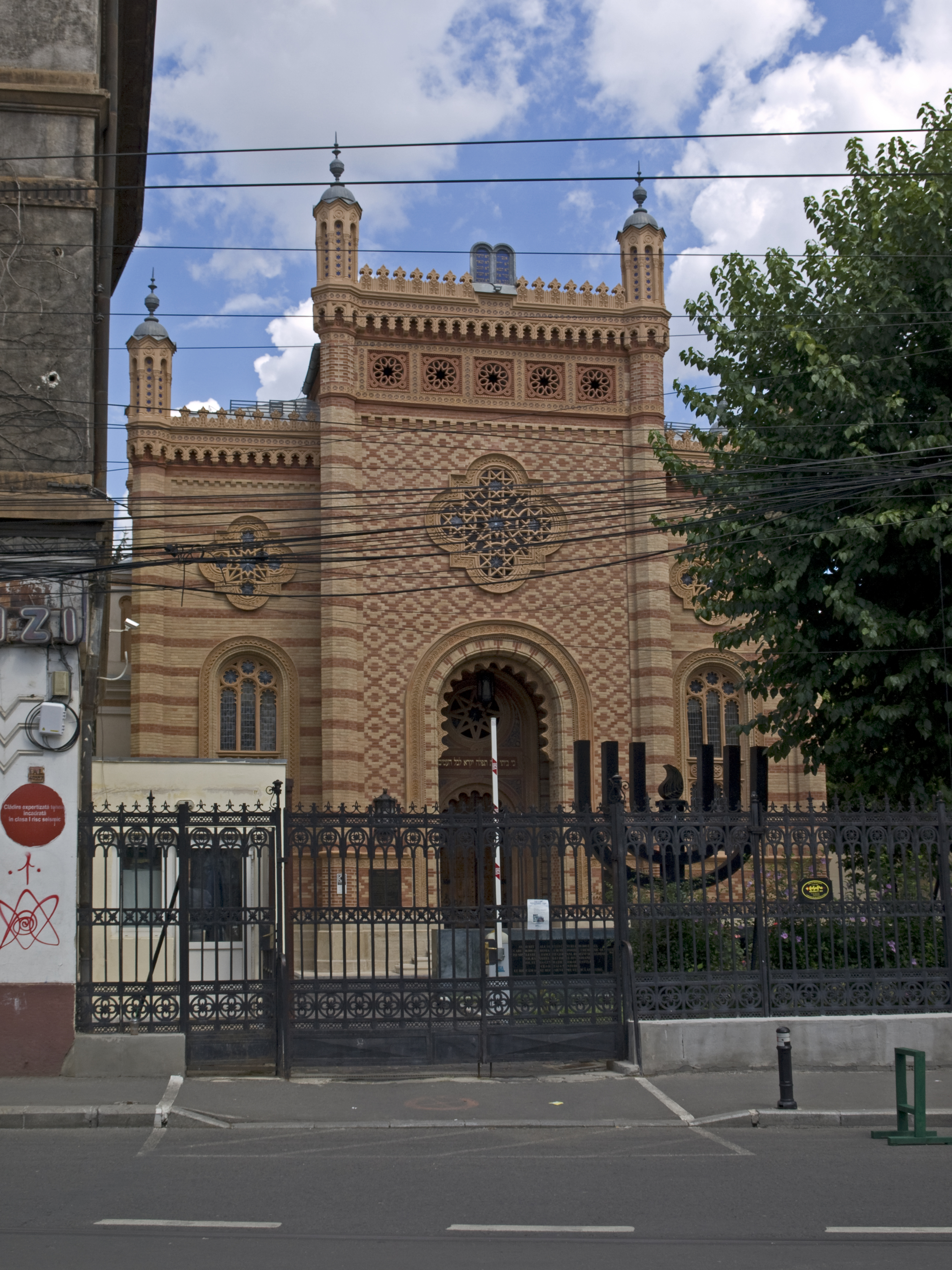
Templul Coral, 2016

The History of the Jews in Bucharest goes back to the 16th century.

The first known Jew in Bucharest was Isaiah ben Joseph, who was secretary to Prince Alexander II Mircea in 1573. When Michael the Brave rose against Turkey in 1594, all the Jews of Bucharest were massacred. The Jewish population subsequently recovered.

== 17th century ==
Not much is known of Jews residing in Bucharest during the seventeenth century, except that they were engaged in commerce and in the manufacture and sale of liquor, while a few practiced medicine. The oldest Jewish tombstone in the city is dated 1682.

Under Constantin Brancovan (1689–1714), a Jew surnamed Salitrariul (maker of saltpeter) furnished that prince with the gunpowder needed in the army.

The Jews formed a corporation of their own with a "staroste" (provost) at their head, and were restricted to one suburb. In addition to their personal taxes, special assessments were levied upon them as a corporate body, out of all proportion to those imposed on other organizations of the city. In 1695, they were assessed 150 thalers to support the Turkish army in the war against Austria, and 100 thalers for boats.

== 18th century ==
In 1715, Ștefan Cantacuzino ordered the synagogue to be demolished. This led to a riot, during which the Jewish provost was killed. Upon payment of a heavy sum the Jews were permitted to rebuild their synagogue and resume worship. Better times came with the enlightened Prince Nicholas Mavrocordato. This ruler maintained most friendly relations with the physician Tobias Cohn of Constantinople, and with Daniel de Fonseca who was physician to the sultan as well as to the French ambassadors at Constantinople, with whom he was on terms of intimate friendship. Nicholas in 1719 established De Fonseca at his court in Bucharest, and lent him his influence. Nicholas also favored Mentech Bally, banker of the grand vizier, upon whom he conferred valuable privileges.

Under the successors of Mavrocordato the Jews were again more or less persecuted. Mihai Racoviță (1730–1731 and 1741–1744), taught by the loss of his Moldavian throne in consequence of his difficulties with the Jews, did not oppress them more than he did his other subjects. His son Constantin even renewed the privileges of the "ḥaham bashi" of Moldavia, recognizing the latter's authority over the Jews of Wallachia, and granting them the right to have a deputy at Bucharest (1764).

The number of Jews increased after the Austro-Turkish wars so that it became necessary to open a second synagogue in a central part of the city. Alexandru Ghica (1764–1766) demolished it upon the advice of the patriarch Ephraim of Jerusalem, who was passing through Bucharest. The Jews opened a new synagogue during the Russian occupation (1769–74), but this also was destroyed by Alexander Ypsilantis (1774–1782). Not until 1787 did they receive permission from Peter Mavroyeni (1786–1789) to have a new synagogue, on condition that it was located in a distant suburb. During the Russo-Turkish War (1768–1774), the Jews suffered from the violence and spoliation of the janizaries. In 1770 they were unexpectedly attacked by the populace; many perished, but the greater number were saved by the boyars. Urged by the need of money, Mavrogyeni, though not unfavorably disposed toward the Jews, pressed them hard. On pretense of taxing them, he made the Jewish tailors, furriers, and jewelers of Bucharest work for the Turks, who were then at war with Austria. The plague, which broke out in 1792, under Michel Sutzu, brought disaster to the merchants already ruined by the Austrian occupation (1789–91). The distilleries, which were mostly owned by the Jews, were also closed.

Alexander Mourouzis (1793–1796) closed the synagogue which had been opened in 1790 in the center of the city, and punished the Jews who had defended themselves against their oppressors. Encouraged by the attitude of their prince, the populace heaped indignities upon the Jews; so that Moruzi found himself obliged — for a consideration in money — to direct the authorities to defend them: he even had to condemn to the bastinado and to exile a Christian tailor who had forcibly baptized a Jewish child. Under pretext of sumptuary laws, Moruzi forbade the Jews to sell cosmetics. At the same time the reappearance of the plague crippled the business of the second-hand dealers, pedlers, retailers, and even of the artisans. Constantine Hangerli (1797–99) treated the Jews somewhat better; giving them a tract of land on which to erect distilleries, granting privileges to artisans, and exempting them from taxation. But the plague, that had become endemic, paralyzed all business.

=== Development of Artisan Class ===
In spite of the obstacles put in the way of the Jews at Bucharest, the artisan class especially developed during the eighteenth century; its members often occupied exceptional positions, owing to their skill and the services which they rendered to the princes, the boyars, and even the people. The provost of the Jews occupied under several princes the position of "kuyunju pasha" (grand provost of silver-smiths). In 1787 he gave way to a Christian; but six years later the position was again held by a Jew, Eleazar, who bore the title of "jeva-hirji-pasha" (grand provost of jewelers). There were also among the Jews manufacturers of pipes, potash, and rackets; also excellent engravers, lace-makers, and bookbinders. Certain Jews attached to the court obtained privileges and were exempt from taxes; and they acquired influence with the princes, the high dignitaries, and the boyars.

== Massacre of 1801 ==
The populace was still hostile to them, and the nineteenth century opened with a bloody massacre. The Jews were accused of espionage and of ritual murder; and on April 8, 1801, the rabble, aided by some soldiers, pretending to possess orders from the authorities, fell upon them, maltreated them, pillaged their houses, and massacred 128. Alexander Moruzi, who in 1799 had again come into power, being frightened by the massacre and his responsibility to the Porte, condemned the ringleaders to the salt-mines for life.

The Jews had hardly recovered from this terrible blow, when they were obliged to leave Bucharest hastily, together with the rest of the population, on account of the invasion of Pasvanoglu, the rebel pasha of Rustchuk (1802). When they returned to their homes the specter of ritual murder again confronted them, so that Constantine Ypsilanti was obliged to request the metropolitan to instruct the priests to proclaim from their pulpits the falsehood of the accusation, which had been spread by persons whose only purposes were riot and pillage (1804). Nevertheless, the populace had their way two years later (December 1806). When the Russo-Turkish war recommenced Ypsilanti abdicated just as the Russians were approaching Bucharest. The populace drove out the Turks, and, taking advantage of the disorder, fell upon the Jews, pillaged them, massacred a considerable number, and penned up the remainder in a certain locality, giving them a few days in which to choose between baptism and massacre. The entrance of the Russians rescued the Jews from this terrible plight.

Their fate during the Russian occupation (1806–1812) was difficult. The well-to-do families removed to Transylvania; and the less fortunate ones who remained behind were subjected to heavy taxes, in which, however, they were not treated differently from the Christian merchants. Jews were forbidden to open their shops on the Christian festivals, and even to work at home during these days. Certain manufacturers of potash were driven from their factories, and pedling was interdicted. The Jews lived in continual fear of being accused of ritual murder, and finally, in order to extort money from them, their provost was imprisoned, and his office given to a German Catholic. Later the provost was liberated and restored to office. The Russian Jews residing at Bucharest only received a certain amount of liberty and a few privileges.

== 19th century ==
The impecunious prince Jean Karadja (1812–1818), in order to extract money from the Jews, revived the order forbidding them to employ Christian minors as servants, or to rent or buy shops in the vicinity of churches. A fresh and violent outbreak of the plague furnished a pretext to Caradja, who accused the Jews of living in filth and of thus spreading the pestilence. Various measures taken by the authorities completely paralyzed the business of the merchants, pedlers, brokers, and others. In order to increase his revenues and to tax foreign Jews who should have been exempt, Caradja granted to the native Jews the exclusive privilege of establishing Jewish butcher-shops. Alexandru Sutzu (1818–1821) confirmed this privilege.

During the first quarter of the nineteenth century the situation of the Jews of Bucharest was not enviable, in spite of the considerable influence which some of them enjoyed. They were treated worse than the Romani people, and were continually exposed to the insults of the populace. They could not venture into certain streets without risking their lives. Their domestic life was exemplary; but the communal life was filled with quarrels, originating with Polish or Russian rabbis of mediocre attainments, who did not know much more than their flocks, and who were driven from office as soon as the opposing party gained the upper hand.

The death of Alexander Sutzu precipitated the Hetæria (Greek insurrection) and the rising of Tudor Vladimirescu. Panic reigned at Bucharest. The well-to-do Jews fled to Kronstadt, while others sought refuge in the neighboring monasteries, where they camped in the courtyards in tents or on mats. Business was suspended, and the workmen were entirely out of work. The Jews suffered untold misery, for the entry of the Hetærists into Bucharest was marked by the pillage of the Jewish quarter. The Turkish occupation that followed was a period of unlimited oppression. For a Jew to venture into the streets meant almost certain death. The merchants closed their shops and left the country. On March 7, 1822, the Turkish soldiers, after a quarrel, charged upon the people, killed and wounded fifteen Christians and sixty Jews and Armenians, and looted the shops.

In the second year of the reign of Grigore Ghica (1822–1828) a fire destroyed the Jewish synagogue and one hundred and fifty houses inhabited mainly by Jews, many of whom lost all their possessions. In the same year the populace fell upon the Austrian Jews, who, on repelling the attack, were arrested by the police. The plague again offered an opportunity for extortion; the Jews, being declared infected, were driven from the city, and allowed to return only on payment of a sum of money. The anti-Semitic feeling also showed itself in the decree forbidding Moldavian Jews to settle at Bucharest (1827). The decree became a dead letter when the Russians again occupied those principalities (1828–34), bringing with them a number of Russian and Moldavian Jewish traders. During this occupation the Jews of Bucharest experienced better times.

The communal quarrels in the mean time continued among the followers of the German and the Portuguese ritual, and among the native Russian, Austrian, and Prussian Jews, not abating even after the reorganization of the community, which was granted by the authorities in 1832. Rabbis were installed and deposed by the different parties, thus causing embarrassment to the government, the all-powerful consuls, and the boyars, each of whom had a favorite Jew. Further, the populace here and there brought up the accusation of ritual murder (1834). Nevertheless, the importance and the influence of the Jews increased; their provost was named grand provost of the gild of tinmen; and their artisans and merchants were sought and honored by the boyars. Some among them were appointed to remunerative and honorable positions. The cashier of the Bucharest prefecture of police from 1839 to 1848 was a Jew. The banker Hillel Manoaḥ on being knighted, was made a member of the commission appointed by the prince in 1847 to aid the suffering Jews, and in the following year he was elected to the municipal council. The physician Barasch was appointed a professor at the college in 1852. The Jews owned houses, vineyards, and estates. They were readily permitted to build synagogues, and in order to reduce the number of these they decided in 1845 to build a large one.

The Jews of German origin especially took an active part in the revolution of 1848, sacrificing themselves for it. The painter Daniel Rosenthal was naturalized and devoted himself heart and soul to his country. This epoch marks the beginning of the real regeneration of the Jews of Bucharest. The native Jews as well as the Austrian and Prussian subjects founded modern schools (1852), and took the initiative in reforming divine worship; erecting a temple with modernized service in 1857. Physicians increased in number; and young men turned to the higher studies. This progress did not cease even when the anti-Semitic spirit began to show itself, about 1866.

The Sephardim, who are called "Spaniards" in Romania, were at first united with the rest of the Jews; but as early as 1818 they built their own synagogue and were subsequently recruited in numbers by Turkish immigrants. During the reign of Alexandru II Ghica (1834–1843) they completely separated themselves from the other congregations, even having their special cemetery. This separation, however, while profitable to them materially, injured them morally, retarding their spiritual progress. After 1866 the two communities were no longer officially recognized. Yet the Sephardim, although less numerous, were able to maintain their organization; while that of the Ashkenazim was dissolved. All the educational and philanthropic institutions and agencies have been supported solely by societies or committees appointed for raising funds, since the salt tax, which was a profitable source of income, was abolished.

The Jewish population of Bucharest, numbering between 4,000 and 5,000 at the beginning of the nineteenth century, had risen to 43,274 in 1899, according to the census of that year. The Sephardim had two synagogues; the Ashkenazim, a large number in addition to the Temple. The only congregation organized by the Ashkenazim was that of the Temple using the western ritual, with M. Beck at its head as rabbi and preacher. Since the law of 1893 practically excluding their children from the public schools, the Jews of Bucharest have maintained six primary schools for boys and two for girls, a professional school for boys and one for girls, a business school, and a gymnasium. They also had a hospital, two homes for the aged, two burial societies (ḥebrah ḳaddishah), and a large number of philanthropic societies and institutions.
