= Legionnaires' rebellion and Bucharest pogrom =

Riot in Romania in 1941

Legionnaires' rebellion
- Part of World War II
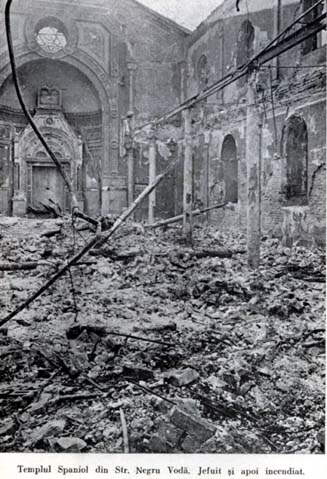
- The Sephardic Temple in Bucharest after it was looted and set on fire
Date	21–23 January 1941
Location	Romania (mainly Bucharest but also other places, most notably Brașov and Piatra Neamț)
Result	Romanian government victory: Rebellion suppressed; Horia Sima and other Legionnaire leaders flee to Germany; Jewish casualties, widespread damage to Jewish homes, businesses and synagogues

Belligerents
Romania; Supported by: Germany: Wehrmacht	Iron Guard; Supported by: Germany: Schutzstaffel

Commanders and leaders
Ion Antonescu; Constantin Sănătescu	Horia Sima

Strength
	In Bucharest: 4 armored vehicles 200 trucks 5,000 firearms

Casualties and losses
30 killed 100 wounded	200–800 killed or wounded 9,000 detained
- 125+ Jews killed during the pogrom

Between 21 and 23 January 1941, a rebellion of the Iron Guard paramilitary organization, whose members were known as Legionnaires, occurred in Bucharest, Romania. As their privileges were being gradually removed by the Conducător Ion Antonescu, the Legionnaires revolted. During the rebellion and subsequent pogrom, the Iron Guard killed 125 Jews, and 30 soldiers died in the confrontation with the rebels. Following this, the Iron Guard movement was banned and 9,000 of its members were imprisoned.

== Background ==
Following World War I Romania gained many new territories, thus becoming "Greater Romania". However, the international recognition of the formal union with these territories came with the condition of granting civil rights to ethnic minorities in those regions. The new territories, especially Bessarabia and Bukovina, included large numbers of Jews, whose presence stood out because of their distinctive clothing, customs, and language. Intellectuals together with a wide array of political parties and the clergy led an antisemitic campaign; many of these eventually came to cast their political lot with Nazi Germany.

The Molotov–Ribbentrop Pact (August 1939) allowed the Soviet Union to take Bessarabia and northern Bukovina in June 1940, leading to the June 1940 Soviet Ultimatum and Soviet occupation of those regions. In August 1940 Germany and Italy mediated Romanian disputes with Hungary about Transylvania (resulting in the Second Vienna Award) and with Bulgaria regarding Dobruja (resulting in the Treaty of Craiova). Large areas of Romania were ceded to Hungary and Bulgaria.

During the Romanian army's withdrawal from Bessarabia, some local residents celebrated. Attacks on soldiers by locals are also documented. Various reports speak of attacks on the retreating soldiers by Jews—though the veracity of those reports is disputed—and some have been proven to be fabrications. Additionally, although the reports defined all of the celebrators and attackers as "Jews", some were Ukrainians, Russians, pro-Communists, newly released criminals, and ethnic Romanians. These reports, regardless of veracity, did much to incite many Romanians against Jews, strengthening existing antisemitic sentiment.

The Romanians were traumatized and frustrated by giving up these areas without a war, and the regime's position weakened significantly. The government scapegoated the Jews, with the support of the press:

Confronted with an extremely serious crisis and doubting their regime could survive, Romanian government officials turned the Jews into a political "lightning rod", channeling popular discontent toward the minority. Notable in this report is the reaction of the Romanian press, whose rage was directed more toward Jews than the Soviets, the real aggressors. Given that the Romanian press was censored in 1940, the government must have played a role in creating this bias. A typical form of anticipatory scapegoating was to let Jewish leaders know that the Romanian authorities might launch acts of repression against the Jews.

The antisemitic legislation that began with the "Jewish Codex" in Romania, and the establishment of the National Legionary State government, set in motion the laws of Romanianization, which deprived Jewish people of their property and distributed it among supporters of the new regime. This created an atmosphere in which antisemitism was seen as legitimate, and even sanctioned.

Politically, control was in the hands of the Conducător Ion Antonescu, heading the antisemitic fascist coalition government, together with Horia Sima. The latter commanded the paramilitary Legionnaire militia known as the Iron Guard (originally called "The Legion of the Archangel Michael", hence the name "Legionnaires"). There was a great deal of tension between the two leaders due to Iron Guard seizures of Jewish property. Antonescu thought the robbery was done in a fashion detrimental to the Romanian economy, and the stolen property did not benefit the government, only the Legionnaires and their associates. Besides the Jewish issue, the Legionnaires, achieving power after many years of persecution by the former regime of King Carol II (which killed their first leader and founder Corneliu Zelea Codreanu, "the Captain"), were vengeful toward anyone associated with the regime.

== Preparations for the rebellion ==
The disagreement between Antonescu and the Iron Guard about the robbery of the Jews was not about the robbery itself but about the method, and the final destination of the stolen property. Antonescu held that the robbery should be done by way of expropriation, gradually, through an orderly process of passing antisemitic laws. The Legionnaires, on the other hand, wanted to rob as much as possible, as quickly as possible, utilizing methods based not in law but in terror, murder and torture.

... the Legionnaires wanted everything, and they wanted it immediately; Antonescu, while sharing the same goal, intended to achieve it gradually, using different methods. The leader stated this clearly in an address to Legion-appointed ministers: "Do you really think that we can replace all Yids immediately? Government challenges are addressed one by one, like in a game of chess."

The Legionnaires had an additional quarrel with the German minority in Romania. According to the laws of Romanianization, Jews were forced to sell many of their businesses, a fact used by many Romanians to purchase those businesses for close to nothing. The German minority introduced a level of competition by offering the Jews a better price than the one offered by the Legionnaires (on average, about one-fifth of the real worth). The local Germans had capital received as a loan from Germany, Romanian money paid to the Germans for keeping military units in their territory (to protect them from the Soviets). Antonescu demanded that the Legionnaires cease their terror tactics, and the Legionnaires began plotting to usurp Antonescu and take over sole control of the country.

Initially, the Legionnaires began "defaming" Antonescu, mentioning his family relation to Jews (his stepmother and his wife's previous husband were Jews). They also accused him of being linked to Freemasonry. According to Nazi propaganda, the Freemasons were enemies of humanity, second only to Jews in wickedness.

In the 20 days preceding the rebellion, the level of antisemitic propaganda greatly increased, using all the tools at the Legionnaires' disposal. The propaganda emphasized the need for solving the "Jewish problem". Horia Sima and his comrades sought the sympathy of the Nazi regime in Germany, and built upon the ideological similarities between their movement and the Nazi movement, and had quite a few supporters within the Nazi establishment.

Antonescu, who had the support of Romania's military, met with Adolf Hitler on 14 January 1941, in Germany. During this meeting, he promised Hitler the cooperation of Romania in any future German conflict with the Soviet Union, and gained Hitler's tacit agreement to eliminate his opponents in the Legionnaire Movement. Between 17 and 19 January the Legionnaire movement conducted a series of "lectures" throughout Romania, designed to demonstrate the national socialist nature of their movement and to show their loyalty to Hitler.

Antonescu took measures to curb the actions of the Legionnaires, and on 19 January issued an order canceling the position of Romanization commissars: well-paying jobs, held by Legionnaires. Additionally, he fired the persons responsible for terror acts committed by Legionnaires, from Minister of the Interior Constantin Petrovicescu to the commanders of the Security Police and the Bucharest police. He appointed loyal military men in their place. The military also took control of strategic installations, such as telephone exchanges, police stations and hospitals. The district officers of the Legionnaires were called to the capital for an important economic consultation, but found themselves arrested in the middle of the meeting.

=== Legionnaire equipment in Bucharest ===
As a paramilitary force, the Iron Guard had no shortage of firearms while it was in power. At the start of 1941, in Bucharest alone, the Legionnaires had 5,000 guns (rifles, revolvers and machine guns) as well as numerous hand grenades. The Legion also possessed a small, mostly symbolic armored force of four vehicles: two police armored cars and two Renault UE Chenillettes from the Malaxa factory. The Malaxa factory had been license-producing these French armored vehicles since mid-1939, and aside from the two such machines, the factory also supplied the Legion with machine guns and rifles. For transport, the Legion possessed almost 200 trucks in Bucharest alone. The legionnaires were further equipped and organized by the Schutzstaffel under the command of SS-Untersturmführer Otto von Bolschwing.

== The rebellion ==
On 20 January 1941, a German officer (Major Helmuth Döring, chief of the transport department of the German Military Mission) was killed in Bucharest by a Greek citizen in the employ of Allied intelligence. This murder remains unsolved, but it was the spark that lit the Legionnaire Rebellion. Antonescu had replaced the commanders of the Security Police and the Bucharest police, but their subordinates, who received their orders from Horia Sima, refused to allow the new commanders to take their place. Armed Legionnaires captured the ministry of the interior, police stations and other government and municipal buildings, and opened fire on soldiers trying to regain these buildings.

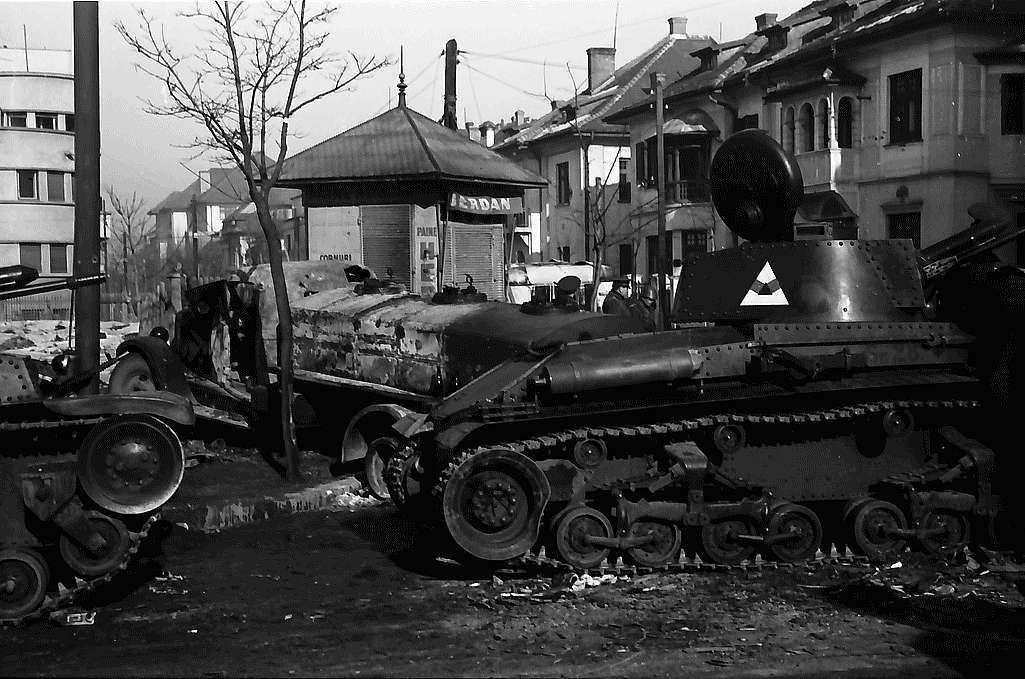
R-2 tanks parked next to a burnt-out tanker truck in the aftermath of the rebellion

Antonescu's public addresses, intended to calm the public, were not published or broadcast, as the media was under Legionnaire control. The Legionnaires called the people to rise up against the Freemasons and the Jews (hinting at Antonescu's relations). The people who were possible targets for assassination by the Legionnaires were held, for their own protection, at the ministry of the interior. The Legionnaires' leaders, headed by Horia Sima, went underground. The Legionnaires held mass drafts at neighboring villages, and masses of peasants flooded the streets of Bucharest, answering the call to defend the country against the Jews and Freemasons. The Legionnaires took over gas stations and tankers, and used burning oil cans as weapons against the soldiers. Only 15 loyal officers remained with Antonescu in his palace. For two days the Romanian military defended itself and tried to besiege the Legionnaires' strongholds, but did not initiate attacks and gave them a free hand. During this time the Legionnaires published announcements claiming that the Jews had revolted. During the days of the rebellion, the Legionnaires' newspapers (the only ones active during this time) engaged in vicious propaganda against the Jews. At the end of the articles would appear the motto "You know whom to shoot".

== The Bucharest pogrom ==
The Bucharest pogrom was not a side effect of the rebellion, but a parallel event, purposefully organized to give legitimacy to the rebellion and to equate the Legionnaires' opponents with Jewish sympathizers. Many parties took part in the riots against the Jews: police officers loyal to the Legionnaires, various Legionnaire organizations, the workers' union, student union, high-school students, ethnic Romas, and criminals. The attacks on the two Jewish boroughs, Dudești and Văcărești, began a few hours before the rebellion. Minister Vasile Iașinschi gave the order to set fire to the Jewish neighborhoods, and mobs stormed Jewish homes, synagogues and other institutions. The Legionnaires' headquarters became torture centers, and Jews kidnapped from their homes were brought there. Jews' homes were set on fire and the Jews themselves were concentrated in places where they could be tortured to take their property and Jewish women were raped. Jews were murdered at random, but also in planned executions. Some Jews were thrown from the top floors of the police headquarters building, and others killed in the slaughterhouse. Soldiers did not take part in the pogrom, nor did police officers loyal to Antonescu. Those officers were forced to surrender their weapons and uniforms, and were put under arrest.

Besides extorting the Jews for their hidden property, sadistic youth (including teenagers) took part in the torture, for their own pleasure. It continued for hours and even days and nights, the torturers taking turns. Jews were robbed of any possessions on their person, and sometimes even their clothes. They were made to turn over property hidden elsewhere, private or communal, and were often shot afterwards, as happened to the community treasurer. Some Jews were coerced into writing suicide notes before being killed.

The persecutors were headed by Mircea Petrovicescu, the son of the minister of the interior who was deposed by Antonescu. Legionnaire women took part in the pogrom; all survivors noted their involvement in the torture, and some of the worst acts of abuse were at their hands. According to the witnesses, Legionnaire women stripped Jewish men and hit their genitalia.

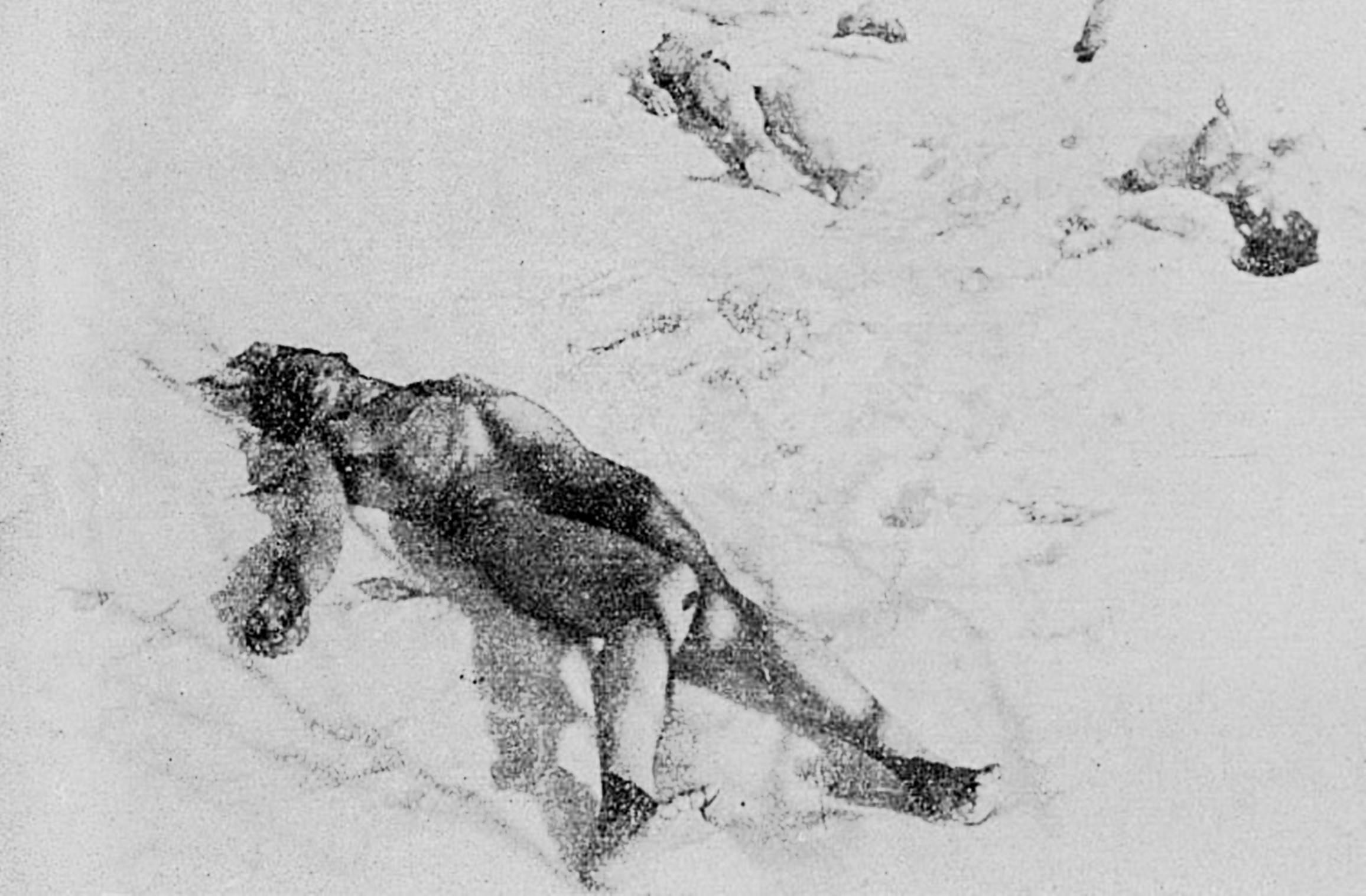
The stripped bodies of Jewish Romanian victims, discarded in the snow at Jilava, on the banks of Sabar River.

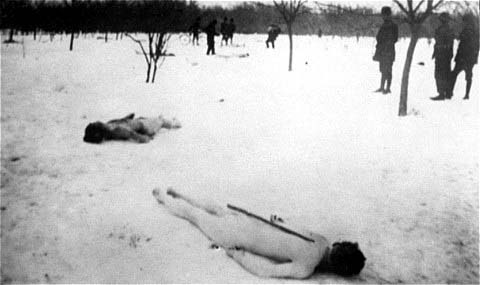
The stripped bodies of Jewish Romanian victims, discarded in the snow at Jilava forest.

On 23 January, a few hours before the rebellion was quelled, a group of Legionnaires selected 15 Jews at random. They took them in trucks to the local slaughterhouse, where they were tortured and/or shot. Five of the Jews, including a five-year-old girl, were hung on meat hooks, still alive. They were tortured, their bellies cut and their entrails hung around their necks in a parody of shehita, kosher slaughter of cattle. The bodies were labeled "kosher". The slaughterhouse had to be closed for a week in order to clean and sanitize it. When Antonescu appointed a military prosecutor to investigate the events at the slaughterhouse, he reported that

he recognized three of his acquaintances among the "professionally tortured" bodies (lawyer Millo Beiler and the Rauch brothers). He noted that "[t]he bodies of the dead were hanged on the hooks used by slaughterers."

The American minister to Romania, Franklin Mott Gunther, reported to Washington on 30 January 1941 that he had it "indirectly from an engineer working there that when he reported for work the next day he found 60 Jewish corpses on the hooks used for carcasses and all skinned. The quantity of blood about would seem to indicate that they had been skinned alive." Of the slaughterhouse episode, Romanian author Virgil Gheorghiu later wrote:

In the big hall of the slaughterhouse, where cattle are hanged up in order to be cut, were now human naked corpses . . . On some of the corpses was the inscription "kosher". There were Jewish corpses. … My soul was stained. I was ashamed of myself. Ashamed being Romanian, like criminals of the Iron Guard.

During the pogrom 125 Bucharest Jews were murdered: 120 bodies were eventually counted, and five never found. Other Jews, not from the Bucharest community, who happened to be in Bucharest at the time, may have also been killed. The Legionnaires ignited the Jewish synagogues and danced around the flames, roaring with joy. To accomplish their mission they used a fuel tanker, sprayed the walls of Kahal Grande (the main Sephardic synagogue) and lit it up. It burnt down completely. In the various synagogues the Legionnaires robbed the worshipers, abused them, took all their valuables and tore up the holy scriptures and ancient documents. They destroyed everything, even the lavatories.

During the riots 1,274 businesses, shops, workshops and homes were badly damaged or destroyed. After the suppression of the rebellion, the army took the Legionnaires' loot in 200 trucks (not including money and jewelry). Some synagogues were partly saved. The large Choral Temple, the city's main Orthodox synagogue was saved from burning completely, because the Legionnaires did not bring enough fuel. In the large synagogue was a Christian, Lucreţia Canjia. She begged the rioters not to burn the synagogue, reminding them of their Christian teachings. The synagogue was saved.

== The rebellion in other places ==
In Turda, Buhuși and Ploiești, hundreds of legionnaires marched down the streets while singing Legionary songs, but they eventually dispersed quietly. Two gangs of unarmed legionnaires in Vrata patrolled the main street of the village, interrogating anyone who tried to enter it. In Piatra Neamț, 600 Legionnaires gathered to support Sima, but they were peacefully dispersed by the intervention of local police. Nevertheless, a small group of legionnaires later vandalized Jewish homes in the town. In Buzău, legionnaires gathered at the police station, but they were surrounded by soldiers and trapped inside. In Târgu Frumos, the mayor deployed groups of teenage legionnaires by train to Iași on 20 January. He soon resigned, however, when situation deteriorated on the evening of 21 January. By far the most active spot of the legionnaire rebellion outside Bucharest was Brașov. Better organized than in other places outside the capital, the legionnaires occupied the gendarmerie, the council chambers, municipal offices, the treasury, the post office and telephone exchange, the radio station, as well as other gendarmerie posts in nearby villages. Five armed legionnaires seized a bus and held its passengers hostage for several hours.

== The quelling of the rebellion ==
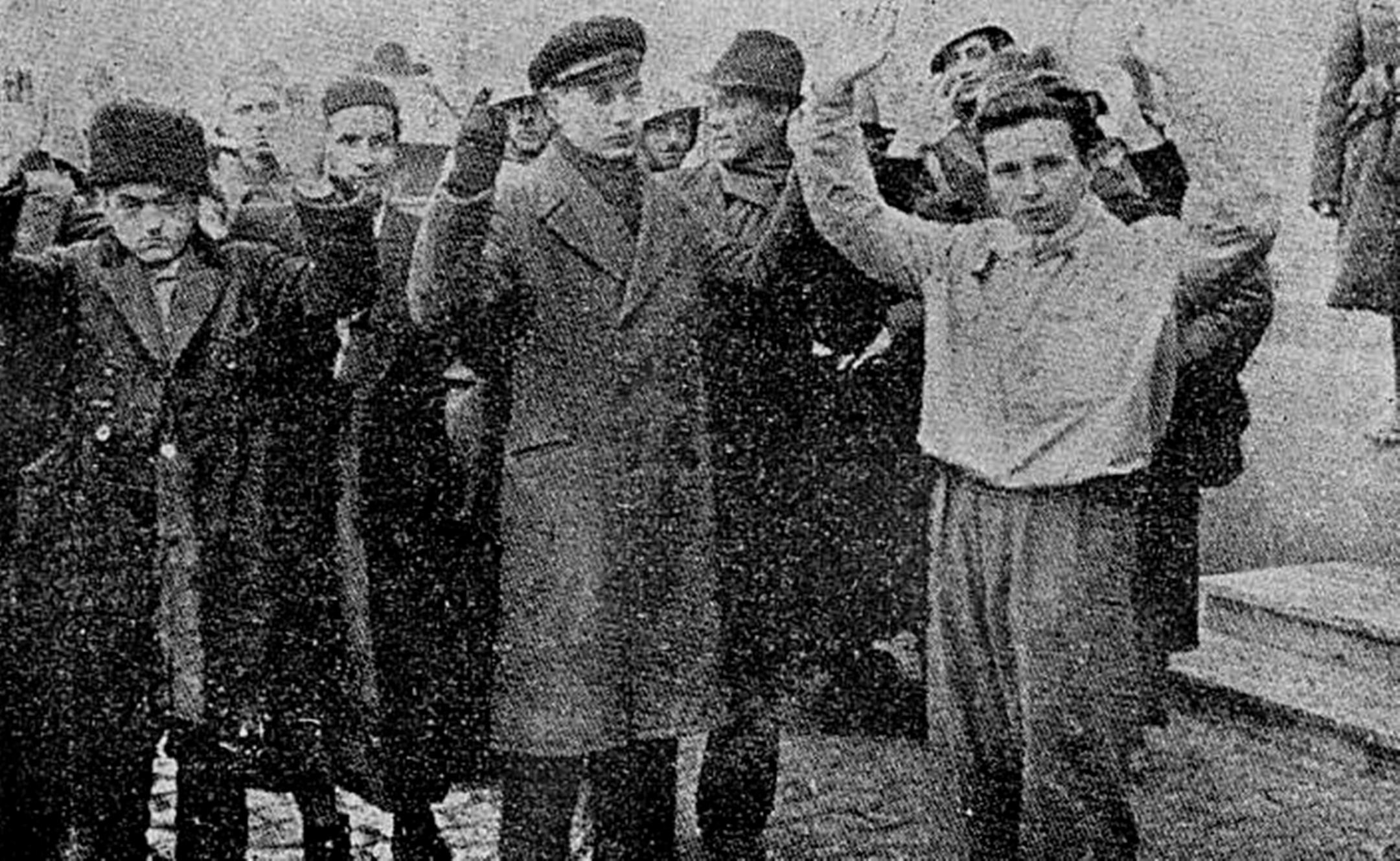
Romanian members of the Iron Guard, arrested by the Army after the pogrom and anti-government rebellion

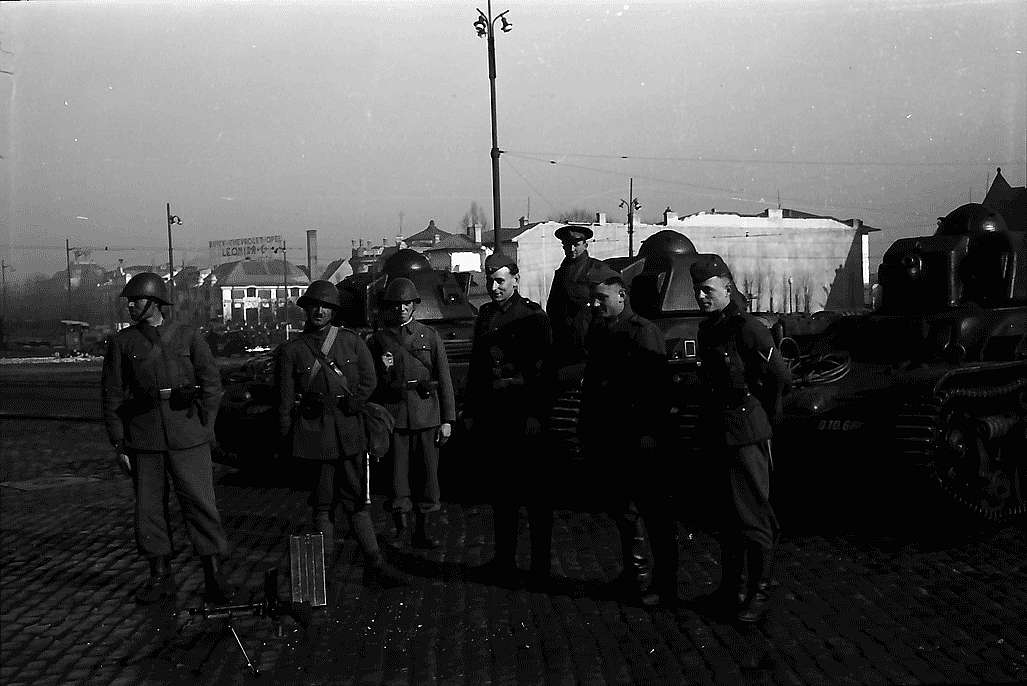
Romanian and German soldiers standing in front of several R35 tanks

During the days of the rebellion, Antonescu avoided direct confrontation with the Legionnaires but brought military units into Bucharest from other cities, including 100 tanks. As the chaos spread—worrying even Hitler, who was interested in Romania as an ally—the horrific picture of the pogrom became clear. As stories spread, the military's fury against the Legionnaires grew. The Legionnaires had assaulted captured soldiers, stripped them of their uniforms, and even burned several of them.

When Antonescu thought the moment was most appropriate, on 22 January, he gave the order to crush the rebellion. The military, led by Gen. Ilie Șteflea, quelled the rebellion with little difficulty within a day. The Legionnaires could not defend themselves against the military's superior firepower. As soldiers stormed their strongholds, the Legionnaires fled. During the skirmishes, 30 soldiers were killed and 100 were wounded. The number of Legionnaires killed during the rebellion was approximately 200, although Horia Sima would later claim there had been 800 Legionnaire casualties.

After the rebellion was suppressed, Antonescu addressed the public on the radio, telling them "the truth", but never mentioning the pogrom. He asked the German garrison, which had sat idly by throughout the rebellion, to show their support. German troops were sent marching through the streets of Bucharest, ending in front of the Prime Minister's building, where they cheered Antonescu.

== Aftermath ==
After the Legionnaires' fall the trend reversed, and those who had joined them fled. The press stopped supporting the Legionnaires, but remained antisemitic and nationalistic. Some of the Legionnaires' leaders, including Horia Sima, fled to Germany with help from the SS. Around 9,000 members of the Legionnaires' movement were sentenced to prison. The Legionnaires who led the antisemitic movement in Romania had fallen and never regained power. However, the movement continued even without them, although it was set back for a while, as the atrocities of the Bucharest pogrom gradually became known to the Romanian public. A few months later those atrocities paled in severity compared to those of the Iași pogrom, initiated at the orders of Antonescu. One leader of the pogrom, Valerian Trifa, became a cleric and emigrated to the US, where he became a citizen and rose to the position of Archbishop of the Romanian Orthodox Church in America and Canada, but he was stripped of his citizenship in 1982 and left the US rather than be deported.

== Sources ==
- (in Romanian) Radu Ioanid, Pogromul de la Bucureşti (covers the pogrom section).
