= List of Romanian Jews =

This is a list of Romanian Jews who are or were Jewish or of Jewish ancestry.

== Academics ==
- Aaron Aaronsohn, botanist
- Yaakov Bar-Shalom, electrical engineer
- J. J. Benjamin, historian
- Martin Bercovici, energy engineer
- Noël Bernard, journalist
- Randolph L. Braham, political scientist, historian
- Nicolae Cajal, virologist and Jewish community leader
- Gedeon Dagan, hydrologist
- Constantin Dobrogeanu-Gherea, sociologist and Marxist theorist
- Lazăr Edeleanu, chemist
- Zicman Feider, biologist, acarologist
- Herman Finer, political scientist
- Peter Freund, theoretical physicist
- Moses Gaster, hakham (Sephardi scholar & Rabi), linguist (Hebrew, Romanian), early Zionist leader
- Lucien Goldmann, philosopher, critic, sociologist
- Alexandru Graur, linguist
- Michael Harsgor, historian
- Joseph M. Juran, industrial engineer
- Ernest Klein, linguist
- Charles H. Kremer, dentist and war-crimes investigation activist
- Liviu Librescu, physicist
- Mario Livio, astrophysicist
- Edward Luttwak, economist and historian
- Norman Manea, writer and college professor
- Meinhard E. Mayer, physicist
- Serge Moscovici, social psychologist
- Victor Neumann, historian and political analyst
- Andrei Oișteanu, historian and anthropologist
- Zigu Ornea, literary critic
- Julius Popper, explorer
- Lazăr Șăineanu, (Eliezer Schein) linguist and folklorist
- Itamar Singer (1946–2012), Israeli historian
- Heimann Hariton Tiktin, linguist
- Vladimir Tismăneanu, historian and political analyst
- David Wechsler, psychologist
- Avram Leib Zissu, political leader, Zionist activist, author, opinion journalist

=== Mathematicians ===
- Peter Constantin, mathematician
- David Emmanuel, mathematician
- Murray Gerstenhaber (1927–2024), mathematician and lawyer
- Sergiu Hart, mathematician, economist
- George Lusztig, mathematician
- Sergiu Klainerman, mathematician
- Solomon Marcus, mathematician
- Isaac Jacob Schoenberg, mathematician

== Artists ==
- Avigdor Arikha, painter
- Victor Brauner, painter and photographer
- Sorel Etrog, sculptor
- André François, painter and graphic artist
- Idel Ianchelevici, sculptor
- Marcel Iancu, architect and painter
- Iosif Iser, painter
- Isidore Isou, Letterist
- Alex Leon, painter
- Moissaye Marans, sculptor
- M. H. Maxy, painter
- Constantin Daniel Rosenthal, painter
- Reuven Rubin, painter
- Herman Sachs, muralist
- Arthur Segal, painter
- Saul Steinberg, cartoonist
- Hedda Sterne, painter, sculptor and graphic artist
- Nicolae Vermont, painter and graphic artist
- Jean Weinberg, photographer
- Medi Dinu, painter

== Business people ==
- Max Auschnitt, financier
- Emil Calmanovici, financier and communist activist
- Safra Catz, business executive
- Solomon Leibovici, financier
- Eduardo Saverin (grandson of a Romanian Jew), co-founder of Facebook

== Film and stage figures ==
- Israil Bercovici, playwright
- Lauren Bacall, actress
- Lucian Bratu, director/film producer
- Christian Calson, director/writer
- I. A. L. Diamond, screenwriter
- Abraham Goldfaden, founder of Yiddish-language theater
- Henric Hirsch, director
- Marin Karmitz, director, producer
- Elina Löwensohn, actress
- Sigmund Mogulesko
- Maia Morgenstern (1962 - ) film and stage actress
- Bernard Natan, film producer
- Ovitz family, circus actors and traveling musicians
- Edward G. Robinson, actor
- Winona Ryder, actress
- Abba Schoengold
- Dumitru Solomon, playwright
- Jacob Sternberg, director
- Yael Stone, actress

== Miscellaneous ==
- Iancu Țucărman, Holocaust and Iași pogrom survivor

== Musicians ==
- Art Garfunkel, composer, singer-songwriter
- Dana International, Israeli singer and musician
- Shlomo Artzi, musician now living in Israel
- Dan Bittman, singer
- Alexander Uriah Boskovich, composer
- Dumitru Bughici composer, pianist
- Sergiu Comissiona, conductor, violinist
- Alma Gluck, soprano
- Sarah Gorby singer
- Clara Haskil, pianist
- Philip Herschkowitz, music theorist and composer
- Gabriel Iranyi, composer
- Mindru Katz, pianist
- Max Leibowitz violinist and bandleader
- Sammy Lerner, composer
- Yoel Levi, conductor
- Sergiu Luca, violinist
- Radu Lupu, pianist
- Silvia Marcovici, violinist
- Ion Marin, conductor
- Abraham Moskowitz, singer and theatre actor
- Joseph Moskowitz, klezmer musician
- Moishe Oysher, cantor and singer
- Simon Paskal singer, cantor and theatre actor
- Mendi Rodan. conductor, composer and violinist.
- Beverly Sills, opera singer

== Political figures ==
- Martin Abern, Trotskyist activist
- Colette Avital, Israeli politician
- Davicion Bally, public servant
- Olga Bancic, communist activist
- Silviu Brucan, communist politician and dissident
- Simion Bughici, communist politician
- Avram Bunaciu, communist politician
- Iosif Chișinevschi, communist politician
- Alexandru Dobrogeanu-Gherea, communist activist
- Mișu Dulgheru, communist activist, spy
- Miriam Eshkol, wife of Israeli Prime Minister Levi Eshkol
- Max Goldstein, communist activist
- Michael Howard, British politician
- Serge Klarsfeld, anti-Nazi activist
- David Korner, Trotskyist activist
- Alex Kozinski, judge
- Leon Lichtblau, communist activist
- Samuel Leibowitz, attorney
- Vasile Luca, communist politician
- Gheorghe Gaston Marin, communist politician
- Nati Meir, politician
- Ghiță Moscu, communist activist and politician
- Alexandru Nicolschi, communist politician
- Ana Pauker, communist politician
- Marcel Pauker, communist politician
- Mircea Răceanu, diplomat and dissident (Jewish father)
- Leonte Răutu, communist politician
- Valter Roman, communist politician
- Petre Roman, politician (Jewish father)
- Leonte Tismăneanu, communist politician
- Ghizela Vass, communist activist

== Religious figures ==
- Moses Gaster, rabbi, philologist, community leader, early Zionist
- David L. Genuth, rabbi
- Ernest Klein, rabbi
- Moses Rosen, rabbi
- Moses Josef Rubin, rabbi
- Alexandru Șafran, rabbi
- Meir Shapiro, rabbi
- Nicolae Steinhardt, Christian Orthodox monk (Jewish father)
- Richard Wurmbrand, minister of religion

== Sportspeople ==
=== Baseball ===
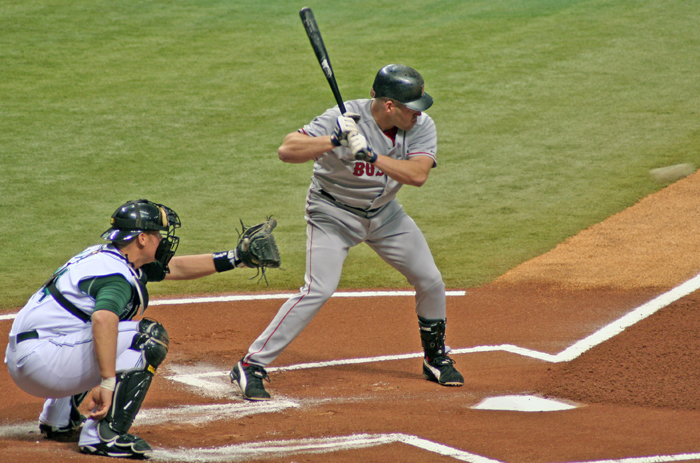
All Star Kevin Youkilis

- Harry Feldman
- Hank Greenberg
- Bud Selig
- Kevin Youkilis

=== Basketball ===
- Ernie Grunfeld, Romania-born US, NBA 6' 6" guard/forward & GM, Olympic champion

=== Boxing ===
- Victor Zilberman, boxer

=== Canoeing ===
- Leon Rotman, sprint canoer, 2x Olympic champion (C-1 10,000 meter, C-1 1,000-meter) and bronze (C-1 1,000-meter), 14 national titles

=== Chess ===
- Abraham Baratz, chess player
- Alexandru Tyroler, chess player
- Bernardo Wexler, chess player

=== Fencing ===
- Andre Spitzer, fencing master and coach

=== Football ===
- Itay Shechter, soccer player
- Avi Strool, soccer player
- Samuel Zauber, late soccer player
- Rudolf Wetzer, late soccer player
- Jack Moisescu, late soccer player
- Elemer Hirsch, late soccer player
- Nicolae Hönigsberg, late soccer player
- Norberto Höfling, late soccer player

=== Table tennis ===
- Angelica Rozeanu (Adelstin), Romania/Israel, 17x world champion, ITTFHoF

== Writers ==
- Aharon Appelfeld (1932–2018), novelist and Holocaust survivor
- Iuliu Barasch, physician and writer
- Zelig Bardichever, poet and songwriter
- Max Blecher, writer
- Srul Bronshtein, poet
- Nina Cassian, poet
- Paul Celan, poet
- Andrei Codrescu, poet and essayist
- Vladimir Colin, short story writer and novelist
- Benjamin Fondane, poet, playwright, and literary critic
- Abraham Goldfaden, poet and playwright
- Alexandru Hâjdeu, writer, founding member of the Romanian Academy.
- Zeydl Shmuel-Yehuda Helman, songwriter, journalist and actor
- D. Iacobescu, poet
- Isidore Isou, poet
- Irving Layton, poet
- Stan Lee (1922–2018) born Stanley Martin Lieber, writer, editor, publisher, and co-creator of most of the Marvel Comics Universe.
- Gherasim Luca, poet
- Isac Ludo, novelist
- Norman Manea, novelist
- Cilibi Moise, storyteller and humorist
- Florin Mugur, author (poetry, prose, essays)
- Sașa Pană, poet and short story writer
- Maurice Samuel, novelist
- Elias Schwarzfeld, historian and novelist
- Mihail Sebastian, playwright
- Nicolae Steinhardt, writer (Jewish father)
- Alexandru Toma, poet
- Tristan Tzara, poet and essayist, founder of Dadaism
- Tudor Vianu, literary critic
- Ilarie Voronca, poet and essayist
- Elie Wiesel, writer
- Haralamb Zincă (Hary Isac Zilberman), writer
- Gellu Naum, poet, dramatist, novelist, children's writer, and translator (Jewish Mother, Maria Naum née Rosa Gluck)

== See also ==
- History of the Jews in Romania
- Category:American people of Romanian-Jewish descent
