= History of the Jews in Iași =

The history of the Jews in Iași dates back to the late 16th century, when Sephardi Jews first arrived in the city. Iași has been the center of Jewish life in Moldavia for centuries. Once home to a thriving Yiddish culture, the first Yiddish theater in the world was founded in the city. The city's Jewish community was devastated by the Iași pogrom of 1941; one of the worst massacres of World War II, over 13,000 Jewish people were murdered during the pogrom. Today, the community has dwindled and has between 300 and 600 members and two operating synagogues.

== Contemporary community ==
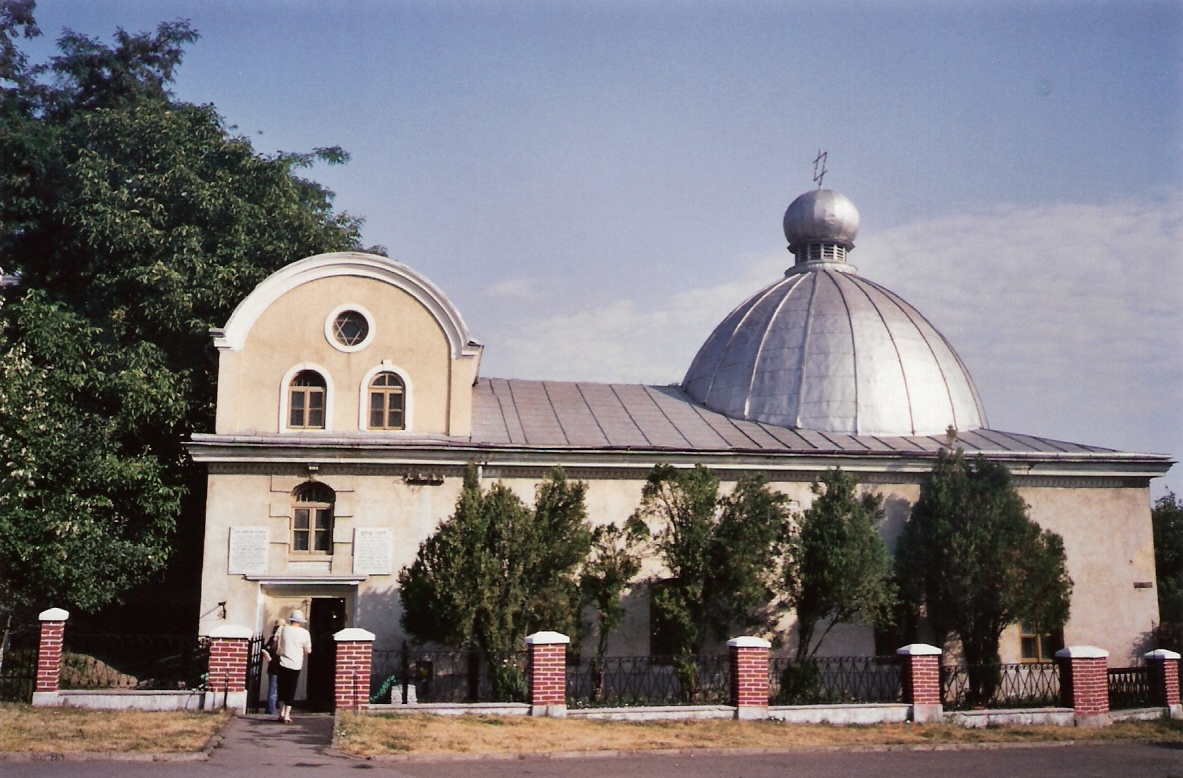
The Great Synagogue of Iași, 2002.

The Iași Jewish community maintains two synagogues, including the Great Synagogue. The Great Synagogue is the oldest surviving synagogue in Romania and is listed on the National Register of Historic Monuments in Romania.

There is a Jewish hospitality house in Iași that caters to Jewish tourists. Open during the summer, the house helps tourists who are visiting the graves of tzaddikim buried in the region.

In 2010, archaeologists discovered a mass grave of Jews killed by Rumanian troops during the Second World War. The remains of the dead were reburied in the Jewish cemetery in Iasi in early April, 2011.

In 2021, the Parliament of Romania held a meeting in the presence of survivors of the Iași pogrom of 1941. The Romanian Prime Minister Florin Cîțu stated that "We, as a nation, must openly admit that our past was not always glorious." Silviu Vexler, the head of Romania's Jewish commented that more work was needed to acknowledge the pogrom, citing "praise for war criminals" from elected representatives of the far-right, nationalist Alliance for the Union of Romanians.

== Notable Jews from Iași ==
- Sorel Etrog, a Romanian-born Israeli-Canadian artist, writer, philosopher, and sculptor.
- Rita Klímová, a Romanian-born Czech economist and politician.
- Magda Lupescu, the mistress and later wife of King Carol II of Romania.
- Bernard Natan, a French-Romanian film entrepreneur, director and actor of the 1920s and 1930s.
- Lupu Pick, a German actor, film director, producer, and screenwriter of the silent era.
- Émile Natan, a Romanian-born French film producer.
- Arthur Segal, an artist and author.
- Iancu Țucărman, an agricultural engineer and survivor of the Holocaust and the Iași pogrom.
- David Twersky, the Rebbe of the Skverer Hasidism.
- Zeydl Shmuel-Yehuda Helman, an actor, songwriter, journalist, and educator.

== See also ==
- Great Synagogue (Iași)
- Gruber's Journey
- History of the Jews in Bessarabia
- History of the Jews in Moldova
- History of the Jews in Romania
- Iași pogrom
- Pod Roșu Synagogue
- Victims of Iași Pogrom Monument
- Der Wecker
