= Pod Roșu Synagogue =

Former synagogue in Iași, Romania

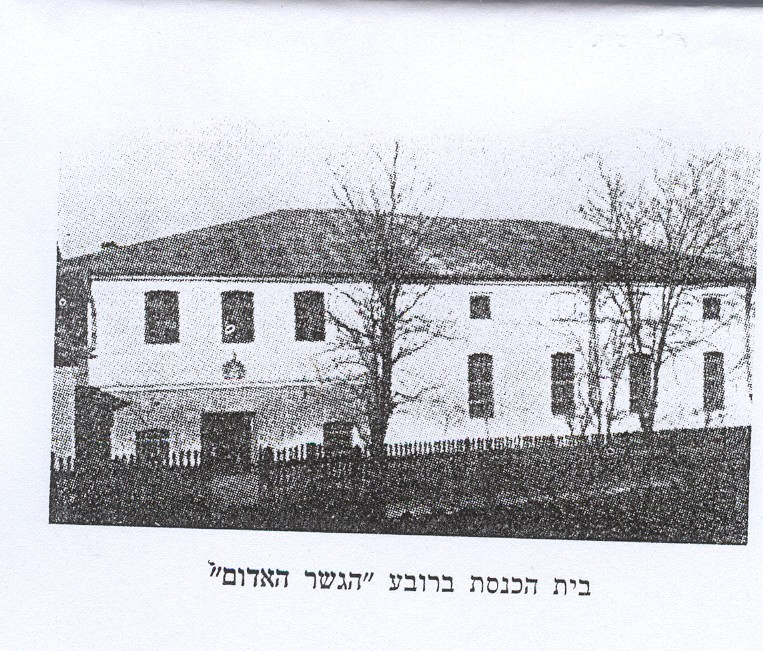
- The former synagogue, in c. 1920

Religion
- Affiliation: Hasidic Judaism (former)
- Rite: Nusach Sefard; Nusach Ari
- Ecclesiastical or organisational status: Synagogue (1810–c. 1890)
- Status: Demolished

Location
- Location: Sinagogilor Street, Iași, Iași County, Western Moldavia
- Country: Romania

Architecture
- Type: Synagogue architecture
- Established: 1808 (as a congregation)
- Completed: 1810

The Pod Roșu Synagogue was a former Hasidic Jewish congregation and synagogue, that was located on Sinagogilor Street, in the Podu Roș neighborhood of Iași, in the Iași County, of Western Moldavia, Romania. The synagogue was completed in c. 1810, and operated during the 19th and 20th centuries.

Pod Roșu means "Red Bridge" in Romanian.

Cucu Street (under that name because of the sales of fowl which took place in a nearby market) was formerly called Sinagogilor Street for the many synagogues that were there (there were as many as 132 at one point), and the Pod Roșu Synagogue was built in a nearby neighborhood under the same name.

== History ==
The Pod Roșu Synagogue was the second major synagogue to be built in Iași following the building of the Great Synagogue in Iași in 1671. In 1808, the Apter Rav, Rabbi Avraham Yehoshua Heschel moved to Iași to found a Chassidic community there (he was to leave only a few years thereafter). As the Great Synagogue (then called the Schulhof) prayed in Nussach Ashkenaz, the intended synagogue was to pray in Nussach Sephard and Nussach Ari.

Despite the synagogue no longer standing, it is still recalled today as one of the major synagogues in Iași.

The synagogue was built c. 1810, and continued to pray in the Chassidic Nussach after the departure of the Rebbe of Apt. The Apter Rebbe built the synagogue from his own funds, though the completion of surrounding luxurious homes, which had been part of his contract with the parnassim of Iași, was unable to be realized. The text of the contracts is to be found in the Apter Rebbe's published correspondence.

The synagogue had a Rebbe's chamber off of the main prayer hall, built in the style of Chassidic synagogues and courts in Poland. This chamber was unheated for many years, and devoted Chassidim prayed in the freezing cold despite this, to observe their Rebbe. There was also a large Menorah on the eastern wall. The Apter Rebbe's chair remained in the synagogue at least until the 1890s.

The synagogue has been demolished during the Ceaușescu Systematization and destruction of Romanian synagogues.

== Former rabbis of the congregation ==
=== Dovid Ba'al Shem ===
A common personality in the Pod Roșu Synagogue was Dovid Ba'al Shem, a kabbalist who previously studied with the Maiden of Ludmir. Although he had a small kloyz adjacent to the synagogue, he frequented the synagogue as well. He was known to perform miracles; he died in Tamuz, 1883.

=== Avraham Elchanan Maizelman ===
Pod Roșu Synagogue is known as the seat of the rabbinate of Rabbi Avraham Elchanan "Huna" Maizelman (1863?-1928), a Talmid Chacham known as the "Poylesher Rov". Born in Halych in Galicia, he commenced the study of Halakhah at an early age and received Semicha when he was at least forty years old from Aryeh Leib Horowitz (1848-1909, author of the responsa Harei Besamim, and Grand Rabbi of Stryi). His wife, "Hudiyah", was the granddaughter of Rabbi Boruch of Kosiv.

Rabbi Avraham Elchanan took over the position from Rabbi Uri Sheraga Taubes (originally from Zhydachiv, author of the book Ori ve-yish'i, son of Rabbi Shmuel "Shmelke" Taubes, father of Rabbi Isaac Taubes, Rabbi in Bucharest) who died in 1890. Shmuel "Shmelke" Taubes was the brother-in-law of Rabbi Jacob Meshullam Ornstein of Lemberg, who shared a familial connection to Rabbi Avraham Elchanan Maizelman as well. Note that Maizelman was not a Chassid and was a Misnagid, despite the Chassidic origin of the synagogue.

Rabbi Avraham Elchanan was a specialist Even ha-ezer, specifically in the areas of Gittin, Yibum and Chalitzah, and Mamzerut. His surviving responsa are recorded in Rabbi Binyomin Aryeh ha-kohen Weiss of Chernowitz's Even yekara (tinyana) 126 and (telita'ah) 165.

Avraham Elchanan was rabbi of the Pod Roșu Synagogue for 32 years; his son, Samuel, later immigrated to Boston. Among his descendants are economist David I. Meiselman and American-Israeli rabbi Moshe Meiselman. He is buried in the Păcurari Cemetery, the historic burial ground for Iași Jewry, next to his wife.

== Gallery ==
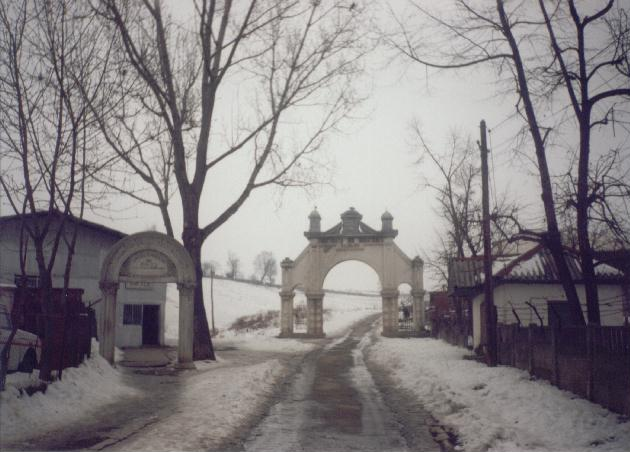
Păcurari Cemetery, Iași

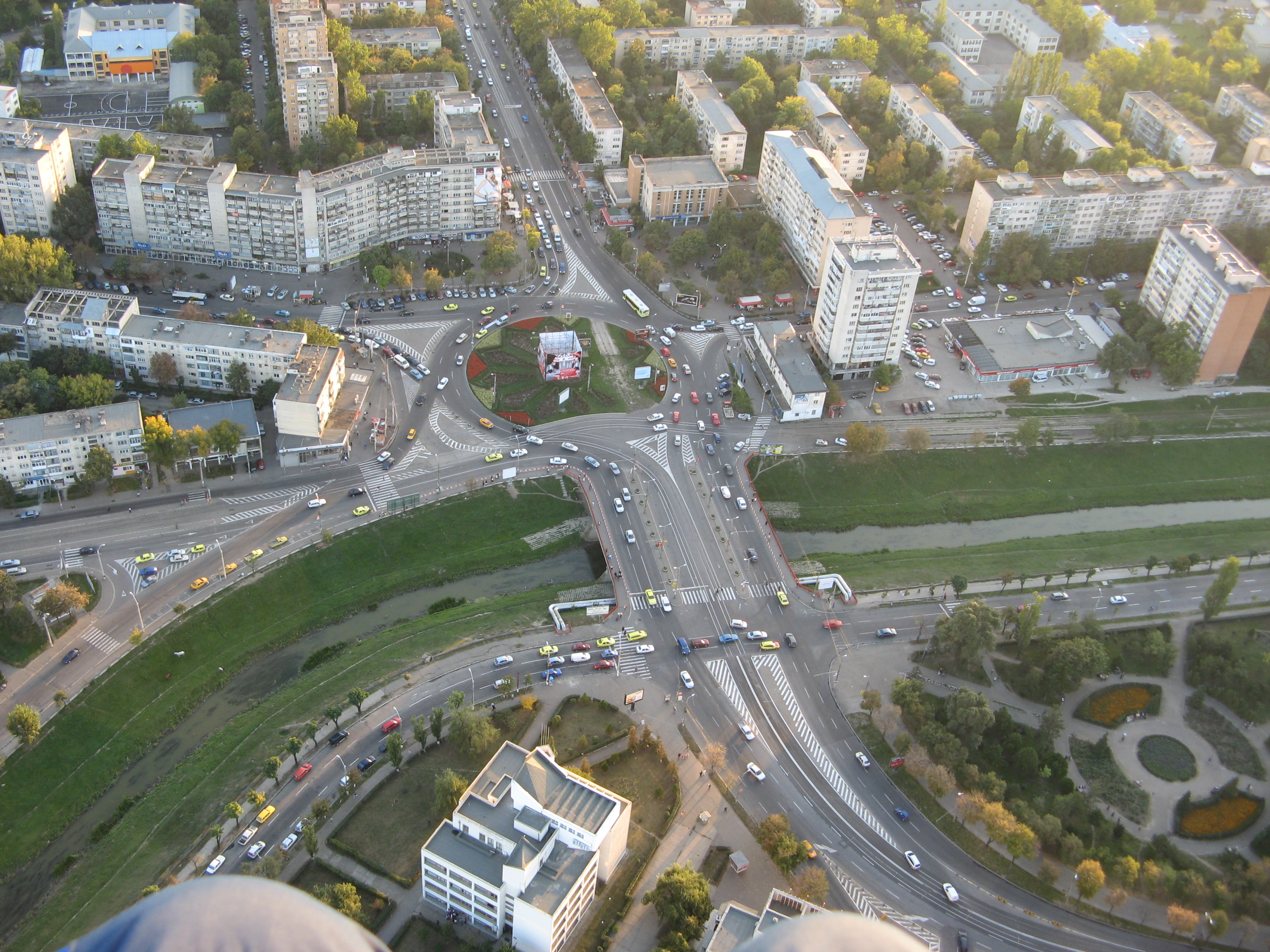
Podu Roș today

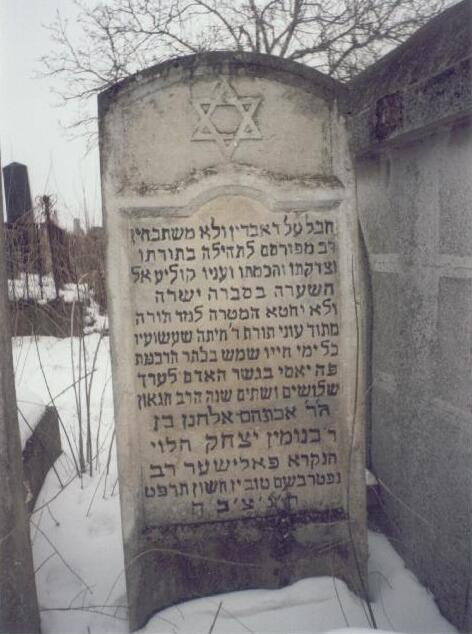
Gravestone of Avraham Elchanan Maizelman

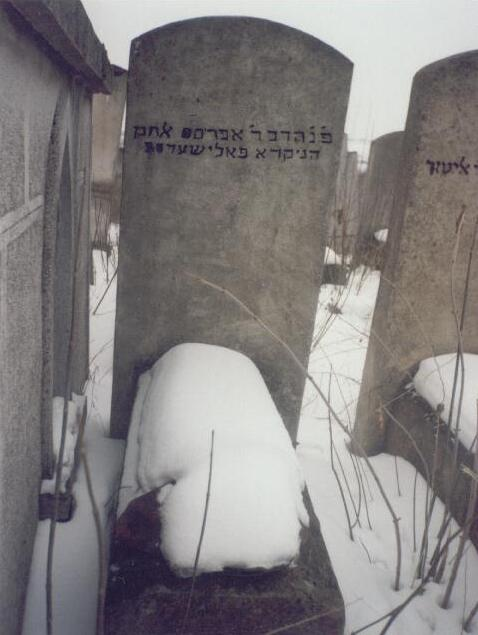
Rear of the gravestone of Avraham Elchanan Maizelman

== See also ==
- History of the Jews in Iași
- History of the Jews in Romania
- List of synagogues in Romania
