= Agarici =

Agarici is a surname. Notable people with the surname include:

- Horia Agarici (1911–1982), Romanian aviator
- Viorica Agarici (1886–1979), Romanian nurse

See also

- Agarici can be a term used in connection with Agaricus fungi, as in Pseudomonas agarici
