= Victims of Iași Pogrom Monument =

Victims of Iaşi Pogrom Monument
- Monumentul Victimelor Pogromului de la Iaşi
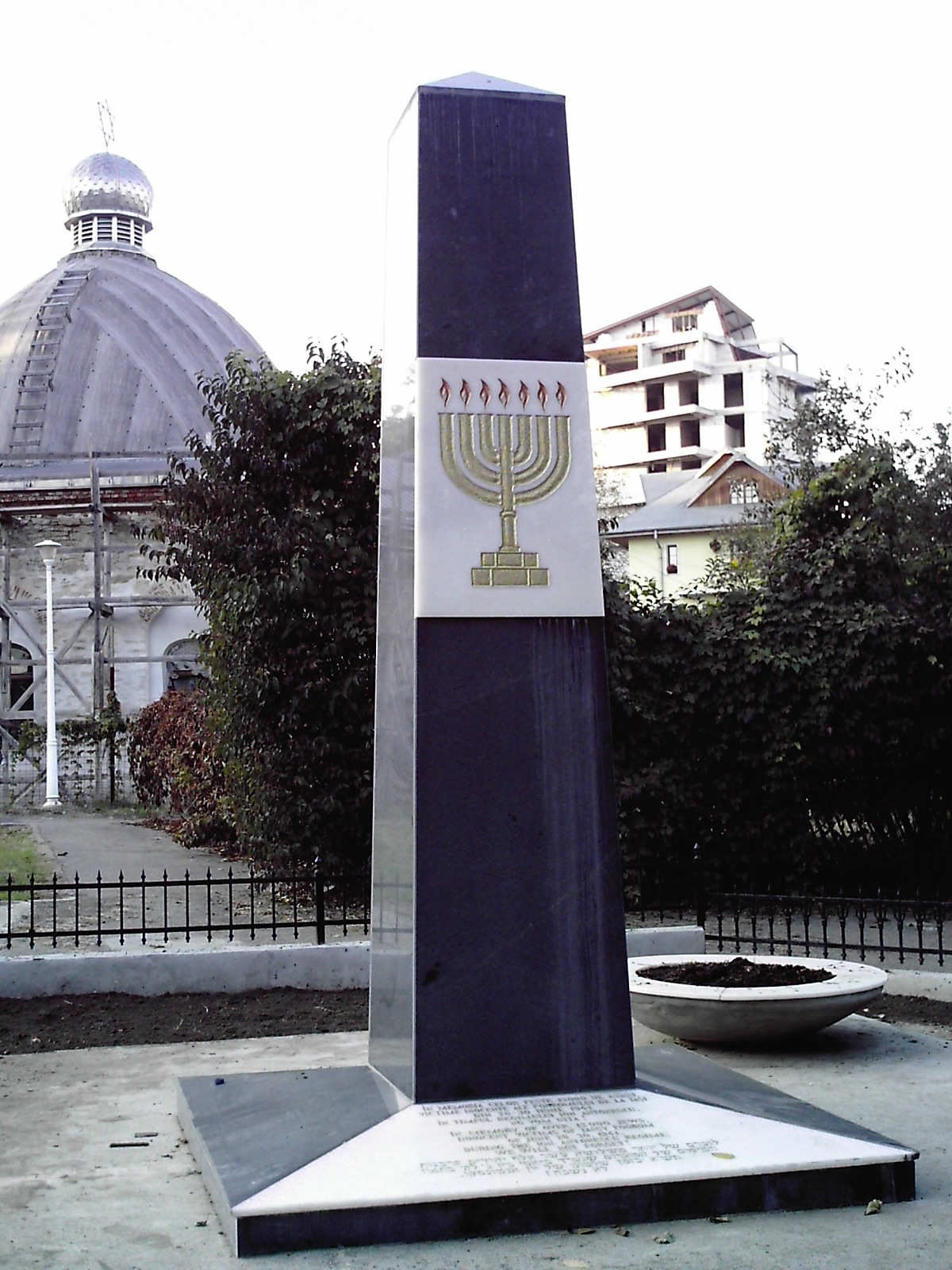
- The monument and the Great Synagogue (Iaşi)
- Interactive map of Victims of Iaşi Pogrom Monument
- Location: Iaşi
- Coordinates: 47°09′55.90″N 27°35′31.80″E
- Type: obelisk
- Material: black marble
- Opening date: June 28, 2011
- Dedicated to: Victims of Iași pogrom

The Victims of Iaşi Pogrom Monument (Romanian: Monumentul Victimelor Pogromului de la Iaşi) is an obelisk to the victims of Iași pogrom, unveiled on June 28, 2011, in front of the Great Synagogue (Iaşi), Romania. The black marble obelisk replaced a former obelisk "In Memory of the Victims of the Fascist Pogrom of Iaşi, June 28–29, 1941."

== Gallery ==
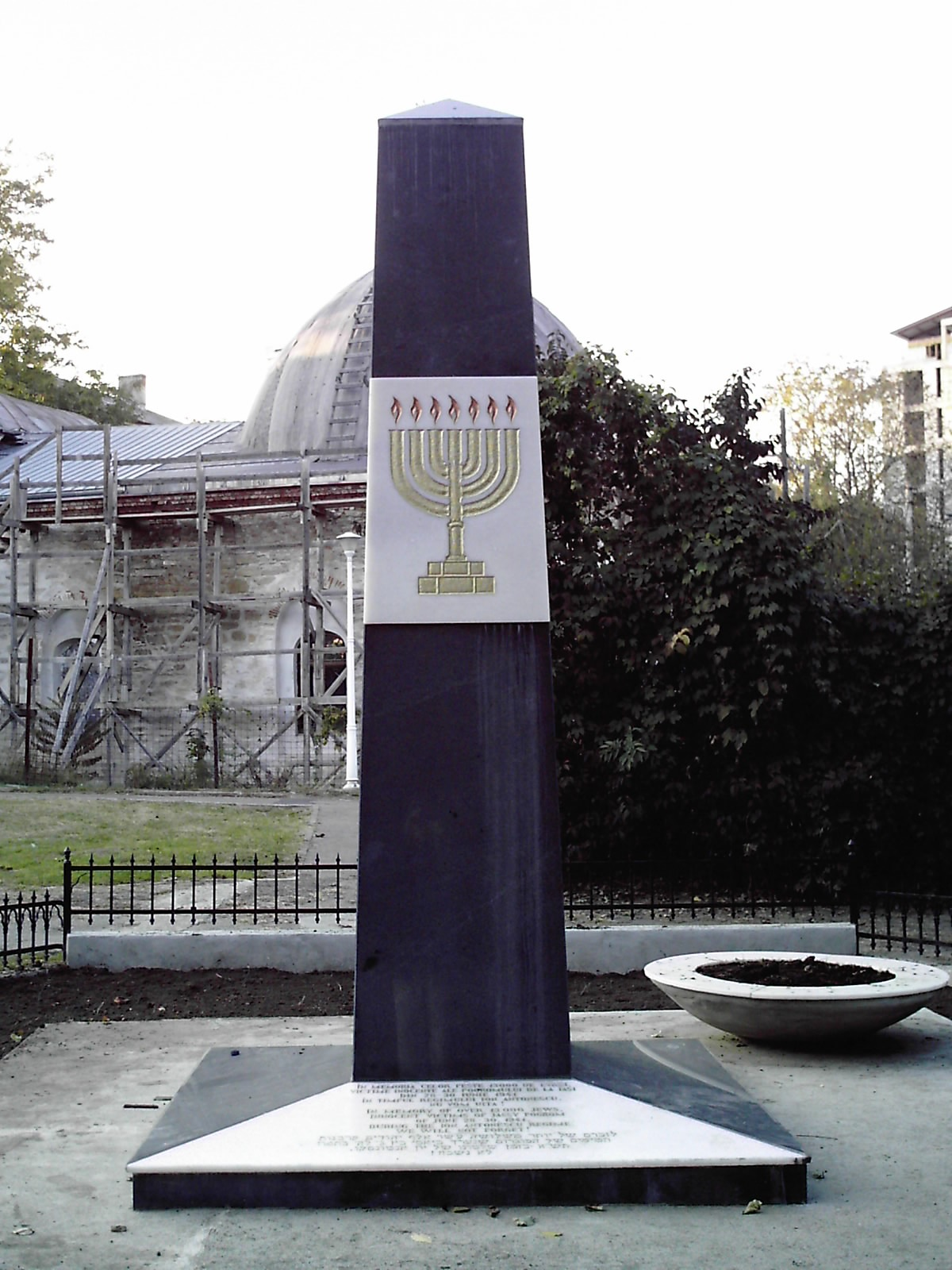

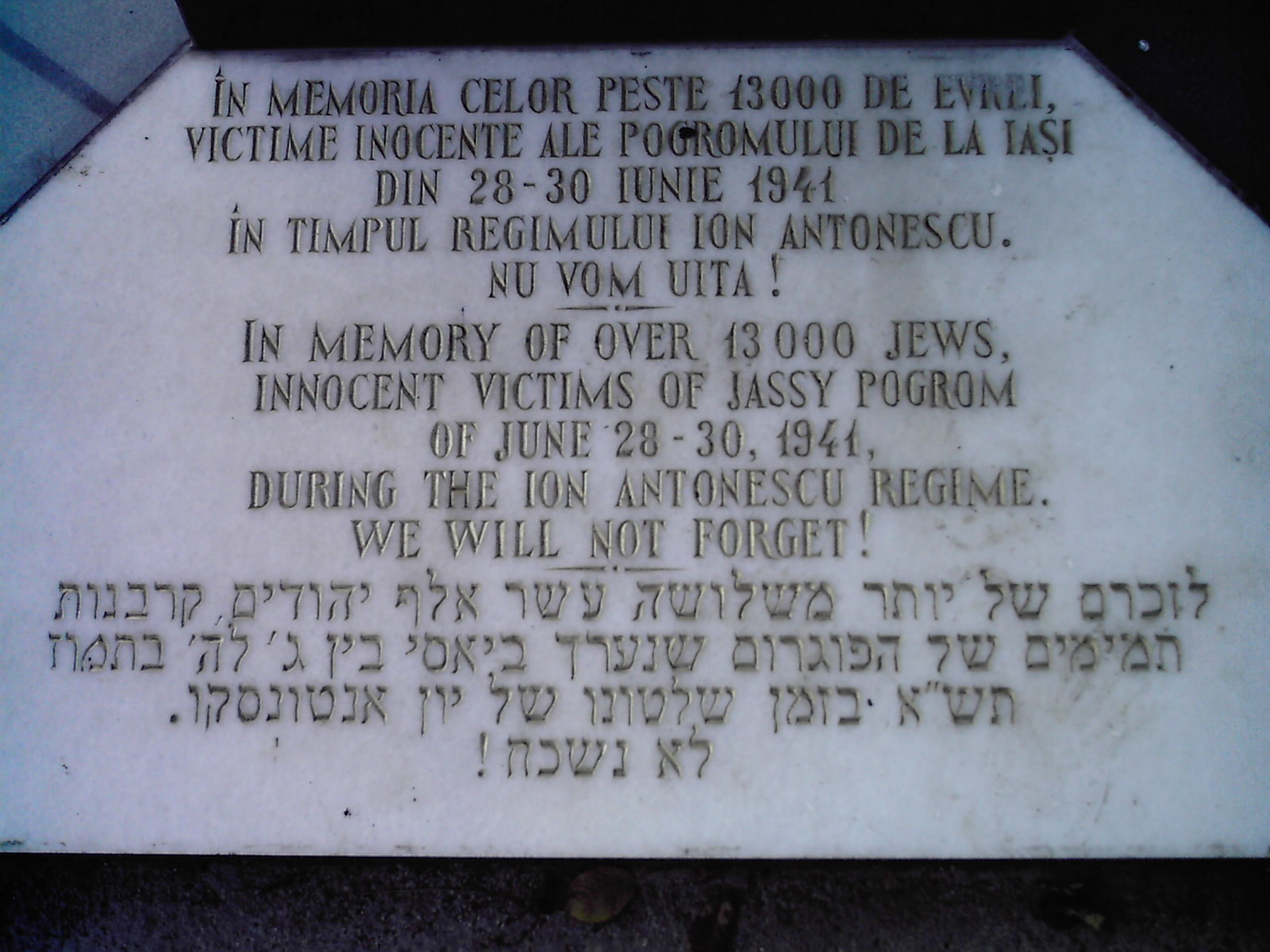

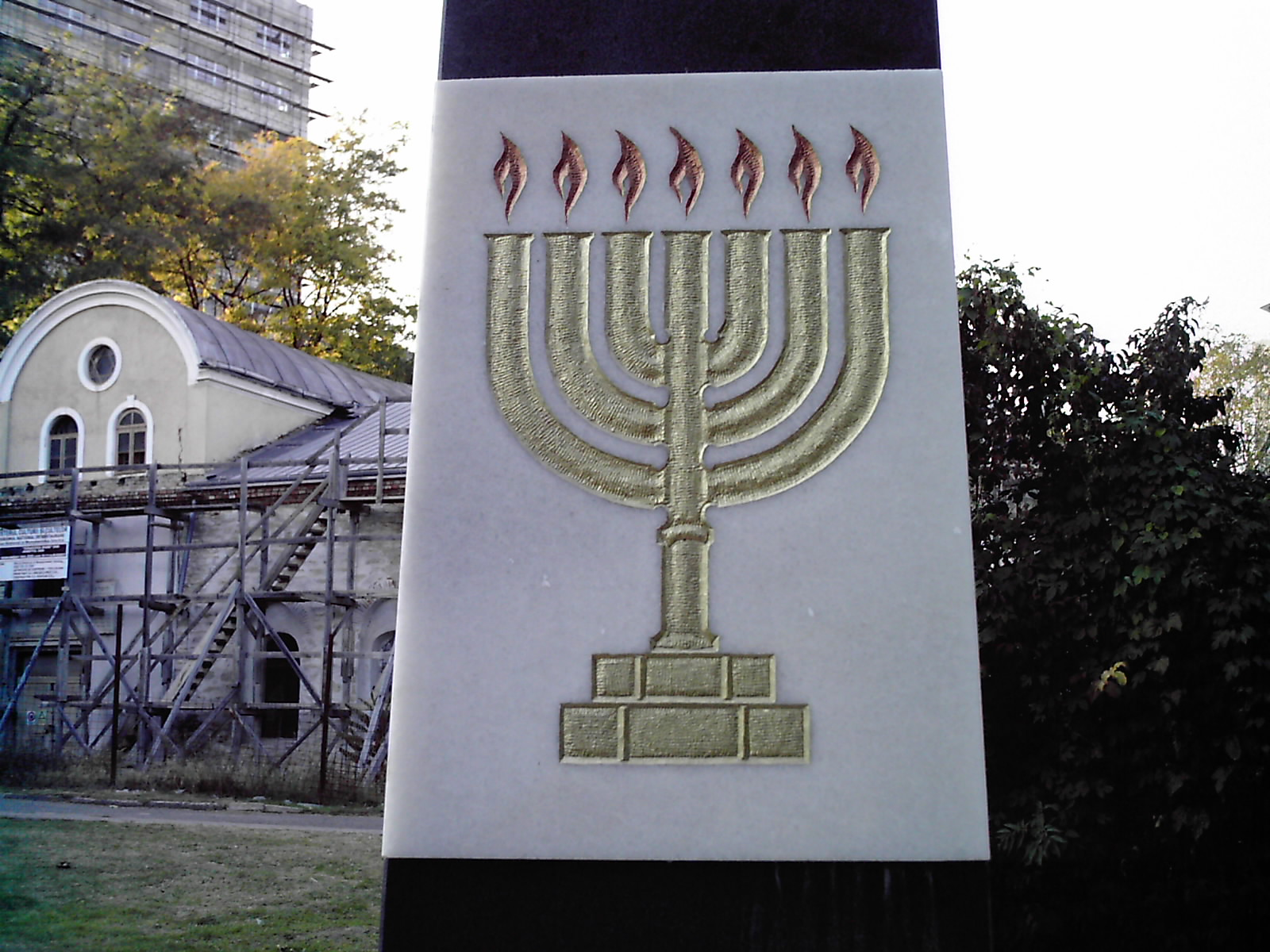

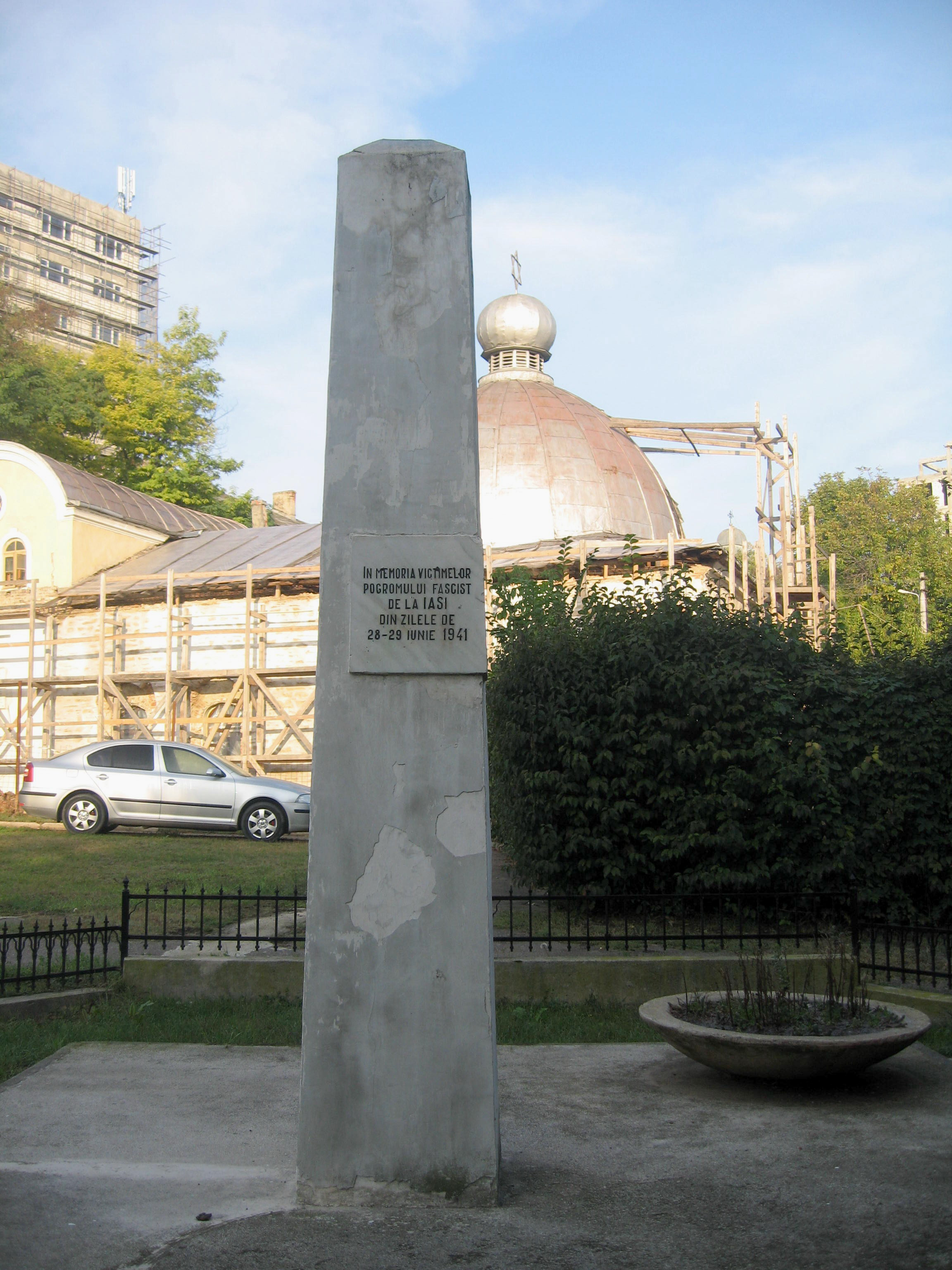
The former obelisk "In Memory of the Victims of the Fascist Pogrom of Iaşi, June 28–29, 1941"

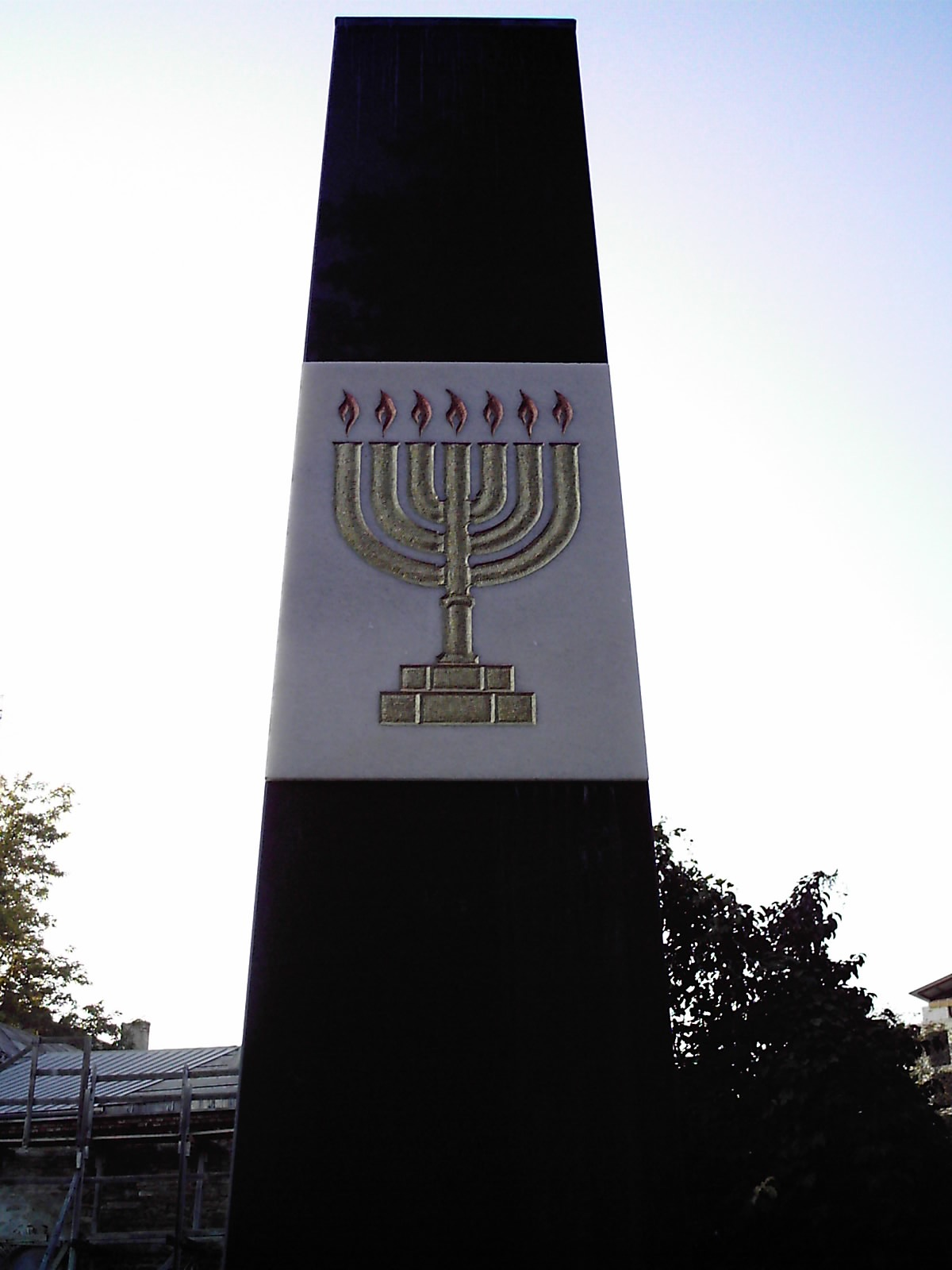
