= Der Wecker =

- Founded: May 1896
- Ceased publication: September 1896
- Political alignment: Socialism
- Language: Yiddish
- Headquarters: Iaşi
- Country: Romania

Der Wecker (Yiddish: דער וועקער, lit. 'The Waker') was a Yiddish-language socialist newspaper, published in Iaşi, Romania, from May to September 1896. It was published by a socialist propaganda group, which also brought out Lumina. In September 1896, the publication of Der Wecker was discontinued due to financial constraints.

== See also ==
- History of the Jews in Iași
