= Dumitru Bughici =

Dumitru Bughici (Romanian pronunciation: [buˈɡitʃʲ]; Hebrew: 'דומיטרו בוגיץ; November 14, 1921, in Iași – June 10, 2008, in Jerusalem) was a Jewish Romanian composer, pianist, conductor and educator.

== Early life ==
Dumitru Bughici was born in Iași under the name Iosif Bughici. He was the 4th generation of well known klezmer dynasty in Iași; his father, Avram David Bughici, was a violinist, and his grandfather a cellist. In the late 19th and early 20th century, the Bughici klezmer family was among the most well known in the region (alongside the Segal and Lemish dynasties); they were highly in demand for wedding and Jewish theatre performances and often toured in Balkan countries and in Istanbul. (Another member of the Bughici family, Simion Bughici, became involved in Communist politics and was the Romanian Minister of Foreign Affairs from 1952 to 1955.)

Bughici studied music at the Iași Conservatory from 1935 to 1938 under such instructors as Alexandru Zirra, Antonin Ciolan, and Radu Constantinescu.

During World War II and the Antonescu regime, the Iași Jewish community was heavily persecuted; several of Bughici's relatives died in the 1941 Iași pogrom. However, Dumitru and other family members managed to survive in hiding. Dumitru's father had built a bunker in the family home in 1940 and hid his family in it in 1941 when summoned by the police, allowing them to survive the war.

== Musical career ==
After the war, Bughici continued his studies at the Rimsky-Korsakov Conservatory in Leningrad (1950–55), where he studied with Alfred Schnittke, Alexander Dmitriev and Boris Arapov.

In 1955, he began teaching music at the National University of Music in Bucharest. It was during this period that he began to compose widely, including concert symphonies for strings, chamber music, piano compositions, ballets, and film scores. He also started publishing academic works on composition and music theory, including "Suites and Sonatas" (1965), which won the Romanian Academy Award, and the Dictionary of Musical Forms and Genres (1978), awarded the UCMR Prize. He served as chairman of the composers' organization in Romania, and was awarded the Romanian "Composer of the Year" award in 1970, 1974, 1976, 1979 and 1981. A 1965 survey of Romanian composers noted that he gained from his studies in Leningrad

a style reflecting the moods, both tragic and optimistic, that pervade the symphonic scores of Shostakovich. Characteristic of these influences are Bughici's Youth Symphonietta, Spring Poem for violin and orchestra, and Poem of Joy for chorus and orchestra. The inherent Romanticism of Bughici's concepts does not prevent him from making use of the most acrid dissonances at his disposal.

In 1985, Bughici emigrated to Israel, where he worked as a composer and music lecturer. Among the most important works he composed were works for the Jerusalem Symphony, from 1987 to 1990.

== Personal life and death ==
Dumitru Bughici was married to Rodica Peretz. He died in Israel in 2008.

== List of Compositions ==
Symphonies

- Symphony No. 1, Op. 20 "Symphonie-Poem (1961),
- Symphony No. 2, Op. 28 "Simfonia Coregrafică" (1964, rev. 1967),
- Symphony No. 3, Op. 30, No. 1 "Ecouri de Jazz" (1966),
- Symphony No. 4 (1972),
- Symphony No. 5 (1977),
- Symphony No. 6, Op. 52,"Simfonia Bucegilor" (1978–9),
- Symphony No. 7, Op. 61 "Symphony-Ballet" (1983),
- Symphony No. 8, Op. 63 "In Memoriam" (Lyric-Dramatic Symphony" (1984),
- Symphony No. 9, Op. 65 "Simfonia Romantica" (1985),
- Symphony No. 10, Op. 66 "Aspirations" (1985) and
- Symphony No. 11 "Symphony of Gratitude" (1987–90).

Sinfoniettas

- Sinfonietta Tinereții, Op. 13 (1958),
- Sinfonietta (1962),
- Sinfonietta da Camera, Op. 38 (1969),
- Sinfonietta pentru coarde, Op. 53 (1979),
- Simfonia. Concertante No.1 for String Quartet and Orchestra, Op..55 (1979–80)
- Simfonia. Concertante No. 2, Op. 58 (1980–1).
- Dialogurile dramatice pentru flaut și orchestră de coarde

== Bibliography ==
- Formele și genurile muzicale (Musical forms and genres), Editura muzicală, Bucharest, 1962
- (with Diamandi Gheciu) Formele muzicale vocale (Vocal musical forms)
- Suita și sonata (Suite and Sonata), Editura Muzicală a Uniunii Compozitorilor din Republica Socialistă România, 1965
- Dicționar de forme și genuri muzicale (Dictionary of musical forms and genres), Editura Muzicală a Uniunii Compozitorilor, Bucharest, 1974 (ediția I), 1978 (ediția a II-a)
- Repere arhitectonice în creația muzicală românească contemporană (Architectural landmarks in contemporary Romanian musical creation), Editura Muzicală, 1982
