= Othmar Pferschy =

Austrian photographer who worked primarily in Turkey

Othmar Pferschy (October 16, 1898 – April 7, 1984) was an Austrian photographer who worked primarily in Turkey. Pferschy began as a well-paid assistant to Romanian Jewish photographer Jean Weinberg, who hired him in 1926. He opened his own Istanbul studio in 1931.

He was born in Graz, Austria and died in Munich, Germany.

His daughter bequeathed his entire archive to the İstanbul Modern.
