= Zicman Feider =

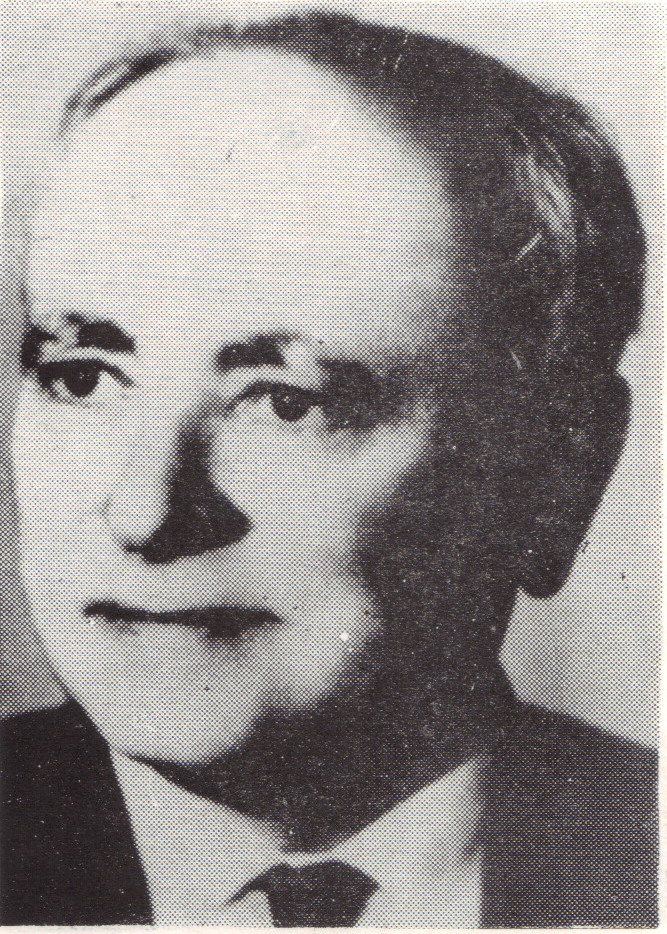
Professor Zicman Feider

Zicman Feider (1903–1979) was a Jewish Romanian acarologist. His name as a researcher is associated with the Acari a.k.a. Acarina (a taxon of arachnids that contains mites and ticks), for which he worked to perfect their taxonomy.

== Early life and education ==
Feider was born on April 17, 1903, in Roman, in the province of Moldova, Romania, the eldest of seven children of Beila and Daniel (Idel) Feider, of Ashkenazy Jewish ethnicity. Beila and Daniel Feider were owners of a small rotary-shop, and as the Jewish tradition still demands, they saved most of their income to offer their son the best opportunity to study to become a "doctor".

In 1922, after receiving his baccalaureate, he enrolled in the University of Pavia, Italy, as a foreign student. From 1923 to 1925, Feider attended Histology and Pathology classes of professor Camillo Golgi, the scientist-physician who discovered the Golgi apparatus, the Golgi tendon organ and the Golgi tendon reflex. However in 1925, after three years of starvation, he contracted pulmonary tuberculosis.

Forced to leave his studies in Italy, he returned to Romania, and was admitted to the Tuberculosis Sanatorium of Bârnova, close to Iași. He enrolled in the Faculty of Medicine of Iași University, and in 1928, he was accepted due to his work in Pavia. The rise of anti-Semitic feelings throughout most of the students and some faculty members, and the lack of Jewish cadavers for anatomy study, forced Zicman to quit studying medicine at Iași. He enrolled at the Faculty of Natural Sciences, at the University of Chernivtsi. Feider studied only one year there, and then moved back to Iași, province of Moldova.

Back in Iași, he studied from 1930 to 1933, at the Natural Sciences section, of the Science Faculty at the Alexandru Ioan Cuza University, previously known as "Michaelian Academy" of Iași, from which he graduated with honors in 1933.

== Post-graduation and early working years ==
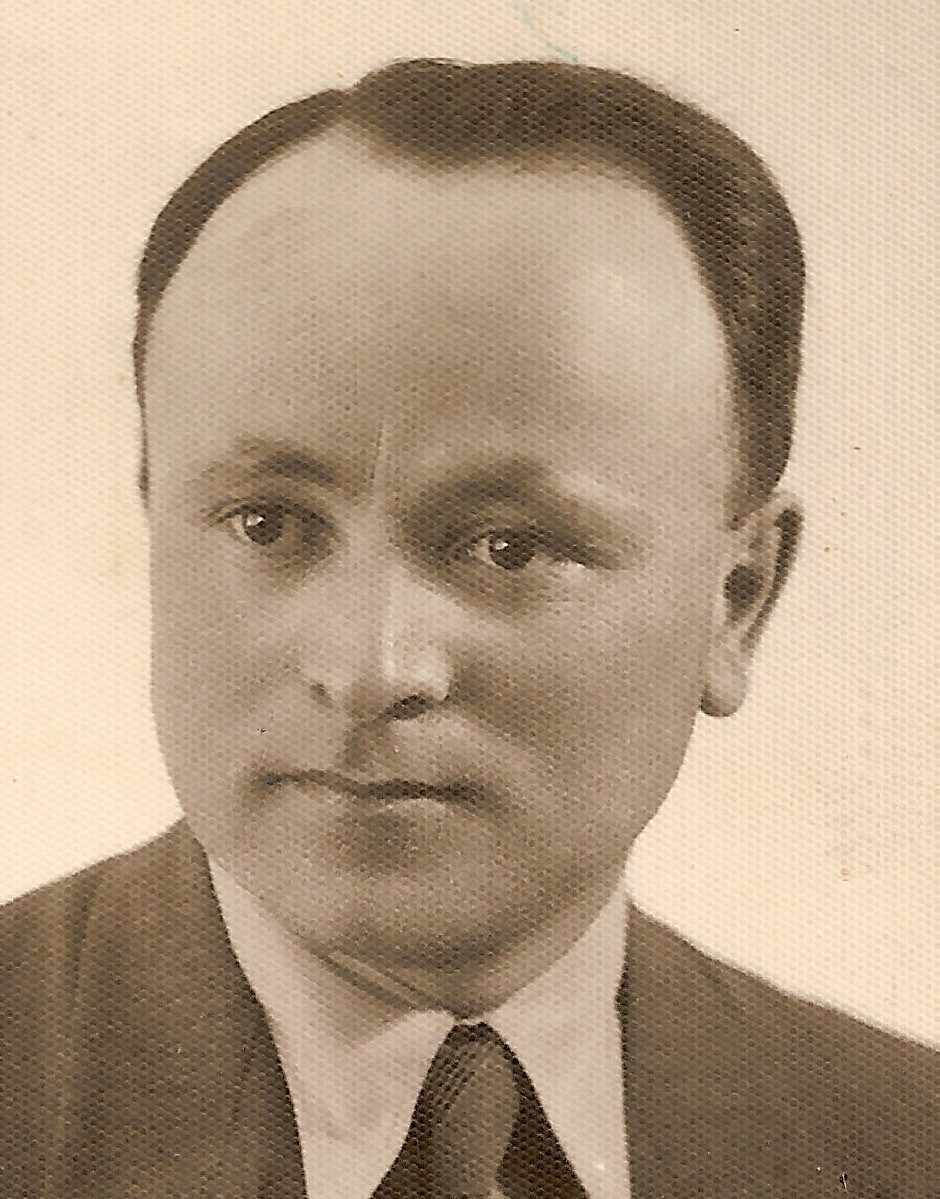
Professor Zicman Feider

Feider started as a teacher in his native city of Roman, and then taught in the town of Târgu Ocna until he passed his Teacher's Capacity Examination in 1935. Having obtained his Capacity Degree, he was hired as teacher of Natural Sciences at the "St. O. Iosif Boys Lyceum" in Odorheiu Secuiesc (Hungarian: Székelyudvarhely), Harghita County, Transylvania, Romania.

In 1938, Feider married Ilona Pal, a local Székely person, who was a graduate of Benedek Elek Teachers' College. Working as a teacher, researcher and pedagogue, Feider helped establish the Natural Science Museum in Odorheiu Secuiesc. In 1938, Feider published in the "Annals of the Alexandru Ioan Cuza University" one of the discoveries of his passionate, under the title "Sur une espèce nouvelle de genre Euthrombidium" (About a new species of Euthrombidium).

The atmosphere in Odorheiu Secuiesc became incendiary after the 30 August 1940 - "Vienna Diktat", when Hungary received northern Transylvania from Romania, and the anti-Semitic manifestation became so pervasive that Zicman and his pregnant wife were forced to leave Transylvania for Moldova. Zicman sought to work as a teacher in Piatra Neamț, and eventually he found an opportunity to teach at the "Jewish Lyceum" of the city of Roman, Romania, at the end of 1940. He became the Principal of the "Jewish Lyceum", where he worked until 1944, during World War II.

From 1944 to 1949, he continued to work as a Biology teacher at "Roman's Boys Lyceum" and at the "Commercial Lyceum" of the City of Roman. Meanwhile, his research was extremely active, resulting in the publication of several papers on Trombidiidae (a.k.a. Red Velvet Mites or Rain Bugs, arachnids found in soil litter known for their bright red colors), in 1945.

== Academic and scientific activity ==
In 1947, he successfully defended his Ph.D. thesis under the supervision of Constantin Motaș, entitled "The Respiratory Apparatus in Trombidiidae and Superior Prostigmata". For his extraordinary work, Feider obtained the qualification magna cum laude. In 1949, he was appointed as an associate professor at the Department of Zoology of the Natural Science Faculty at Alexandru Ioan Cuza University, Iași, and his alma mater. In 1950, he was coopted in the formal "Research Group for Romanian Fauna", affiliated with the Scientific Section of the Romanian Academy, as head of the "Fauna Group" from the Iași Branch.

In 1955, Feider published "The Monograph of Trombidiidae", included in the "Fauna" collection of the Romanian Academy Press. In 1959, he became Full Professor with tenure at the Department of Zoology of the Natural Science Faculty at Alexandru Ioan Cuza University, Iași. He was designated as titular for the Course of Vertebrate Zoology (the biological discipline that consists of the study of Vertebrate animals, i.e., animals with a backbone, such as fish, amphibians, reptiles, birds and mammals) (see Curs de zoologia vertebratelor). He also taught other courses like General Zoology, and Parasitology.

In 1965, he published "Superfamily Ixodoidea" (containing the family Ixodidae – hard ticks), another monograph in the "Fauna" collection of the Romanian Academy Press. In the same year 1965, after years of collaborative work with his Romanian colleagues from the universities of Bucharest and Cluj, Feider published the first edition of "The Vertebrate Zoology". This work was reedited twice (see ZOOLOGIA VERTEBRATELOR de Z. FEIDER, AL. V. GROSSU, ST. GYURKO si V. POP 1967 & ZOOLOGIA VERTEBRATELOR - Z. FEIDER, AL. V. GROSSU, ST. GYURKO si V. POP BUCUREȘTI. 1976).

As a vertebrate zoologist, Feider surrounded himself with other members of the department of Zoology, developing several lines of research for each of them, mentoring them to successfully defending their Ph.D. theses. All those collaborators – Libertina Solomon, Viorica Simionescu, Iulia Mironescu, Nicolai Valenciuc, and Iordache Ion became full professors and accomplished researchers. Some of their joint lines of research topics were "The hyoid-mandibular apparatus in fishes" and "The relative growth in some fish species". The work was done at the "Marine Biological Station Professor Doctor Ioan Borcea", Agigea, Romania, founded in 1926 at the Border of the Black Sea, as an external research institution pertaining to the Alexandru Ioan Cuza University, Iași.

Feider's work with mites and ticks became very well known abroad, and more specialists in the field were interested in his work. He carried out the taxonomical and systematical study of many Acarina groups: Ixodoidea, Oribatidae, Gamasidea, Rhinonyssidae, Erythraeidea, and Prostigmata from Romania; Nicolletiellidae and Sternostoma genus throughout the world. He found phylogenetic indicators in the structures of trichobotrias, aspis, and genital and anal plaques in the larva chetotaxis and visual organs at Ixodidae or in the breathing apparatus, metopic edge and genital structure of Trombidia.

He joined several scientific societies in Europe and the US, and was appointed to the editorial board of the publication Acarologia – a quarterly peer-reviewed open-access scientific journal covering all aspects of acarology, established by Marc André and François Grandjean in 1959. Some acarologists sent him their own collections for studying, to avoid name-redundancy. Feider therefore was comparing Acari from all over the world with the holotypes (holotype - a single type specimen upon which the description and name of a new species is based) pertaining to his personal collection. Feider transmitted his passion for acarology to a group of researchers from the Center for Biological Research - Nicu Vasiliu, Magda Călugăr, Mărioara Huțu, Maria Calistru and few others, who were his devoted disciples, while working at the "General and Applied Biology Institute" of the Iași branch of the Romanian Academy. They represented the growing school of Romanian acarologists, unparalleled until today.

== Death and legacy ==
Feider died after his fourth heart attack, while his third monography about Trombiculoidea was given for publication to the "Fauna" collection of the Romanian Academy Press.

The personal "Acari and Ixodidae collection" of Feider was donated to the Natural History Museum of Iași. Several acarologists felt compelled to immortalize the name Feider, by dedicating his name to newly identified species of Acari. For instance, Subias created the genus Feiderzetes - Feiderzetes latus in 1977. After his death, one of his collaborators and colleagues, Libertina Solomon created the species Myonyssus feideri, and two of his close scientific correspondents, Balogh and Mahunka created the species Phteracorus zicmani.
