= Viorica Agarici =

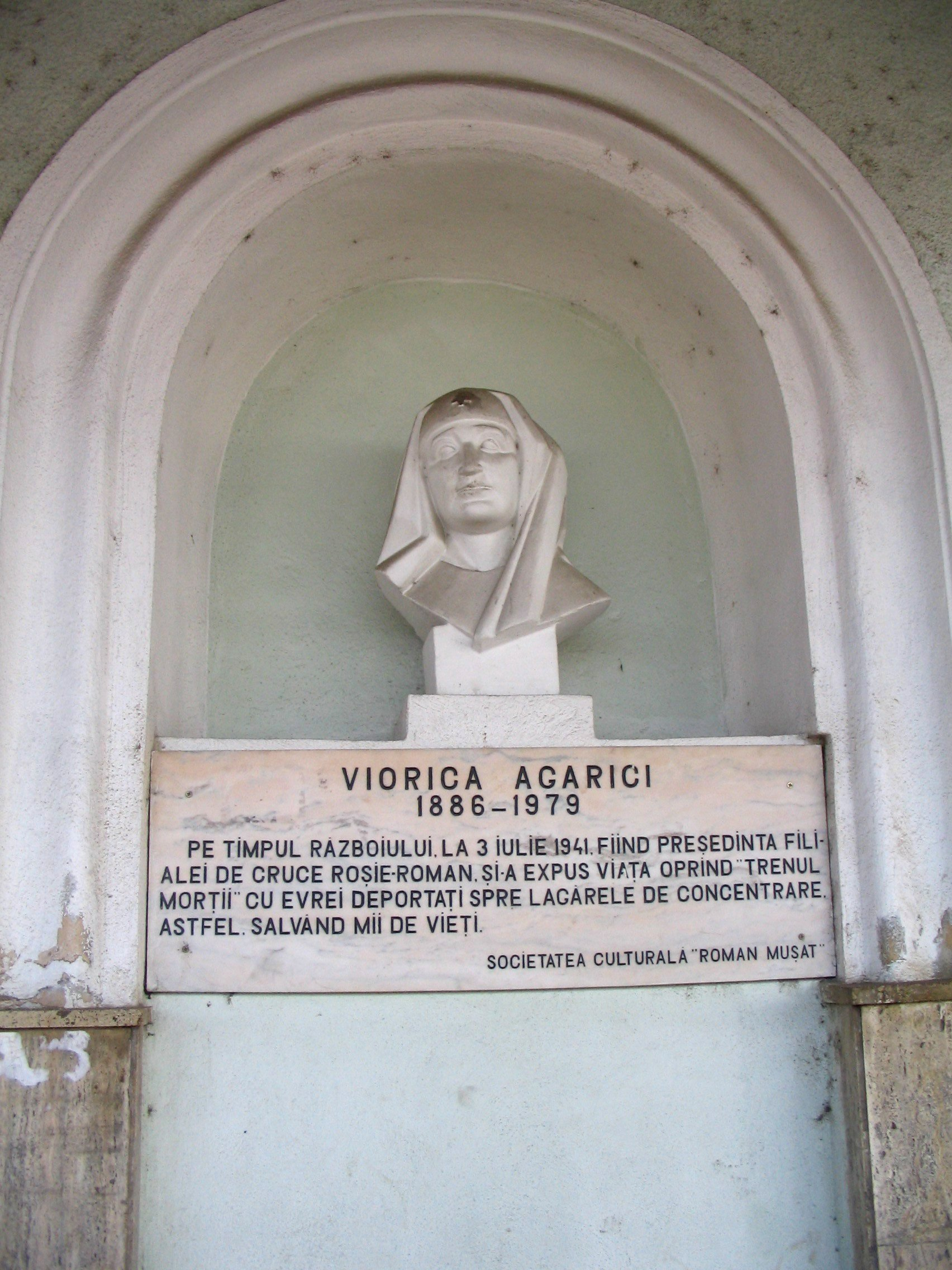
Bust of Viorica Agarici in the Roman train station

Viorica Ana Ecaterina Agarici (February 24th 1886–1979) was a Romanian nurse, the chairwoman of the local Red Cross in the city of Roman during World War II and the Ion Antonescu regime. A protector of the Jewish population during the implementation of the Holocaust in Romania, she is one of the Romanians among the Righteous Among the Nations commemorated by the Israeli people at Yad Vashem.

== Family ==
Viorica Agarici was the daughter of a former mayor of Roman, himself noted for intervening on behalf of the Jews, and who helped establish the local synagogue and modern school.

== Helping Jews on the 1941 "death train" ==
On the night of July 2, 1941, after caring for the Romanian Army wounded coming from the Eastern Front, she overheard people moaning from a train transporting Jewish survivors of the Iași pogrom. The crowded deportees were being transported to Călărași without water or food. Many of them had died before reaching Roman, on the trip from Iași, which normally took two hours. The transport they were on, supervised by the Gendarmerie, has been described as a "death train". The Gendarmes, instigated by Second Lieutenant Aurel Triandaf and the non-commissioned officer Anastase Bratu, prevented passengers access to water and shot several of those who attempted to procure it. In parallel, various local people and soldiers made attempts to sell the victims water at exorbitant prices, while troops, both local and German, attacked the prisoners with stones.

Taking advantage of her position, Agarici asked and received permission to give food and water to the passengers, to allow them to wash, and to remove the dead bodies. This first aid operation was accomplished with assistance from Romanian Red Cross and local Jewish volunteers, and effectively stalled the transport a full day. According to one account, Agarici actually ordered the authorities to obey — a Colonel Eraclide possibly complied due to the respect he may have had for Agarici's son, military pilot Horia Agarici. On July 4, all Jewish prisoners were moved to another train, where they received some food and water (despite the improved conditions, 75 died during the subsequent trip and 69 shortly after). Of 2,530 people forcefully embarked in Iași, only 1,011 were still alive in Călărași. It is possible that the original number was higher, and that losses were under-counted by officials, who did not keep evidence of all the bodies thrown out of the train.

Agarici's actions were strongly condemned by the community of Roman, and she subsequently had to resign and move to Bucharest. Reportedly, she was instantly seen as a hero and rumors about her actions spread throughout the country. In 1947, three years after the 1944 Romanian coup d'état toppled Antonescu, Aurel Triandaf was sentenced to life imprisonment and hard labor for war crimes and crimes against peace.

== Recognition ==
Alongside her Yad Vashem recognition, Agarici was the recipient of several local tributes: Roman train station houses her bust and a memorial plate, and, in summer 2005, her memory was honored through a ceremony hosted by local authorities and representatives of the Jewish community. She was also publicly praised by Rabbi Alexandru Șafran, the Jewish community leader during World War II, who cited her among the "humane people in inhumane times" (Șafran's list also included Queen-Mother Elena).
