= Jean Weinberg =

Romanian photographer

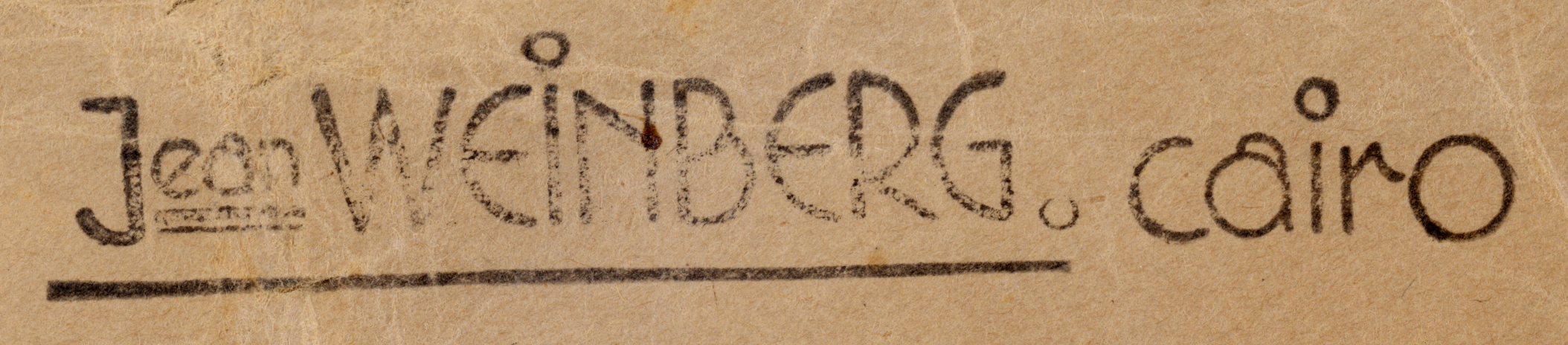
- Weinberg logo c. 1943.
- Born: 1887; Romania
- Died: circa 1956–?
- Occupations: Photographer; studio owner
- Known for: Founding and operating Foto Français studio in Istanbul; portrait photography of Egyptian royalty in Cairo

Jean Weinberg (1887–1942) was a Romanian Jewish photographer.

Weinberg owned the Foto Français studio in the Pera (currently known as Beyoğlu) district of Istanbul. In 1926, he hired Austrian photographer Othmar Pferschy as his assistant. Pferschy left him in 1931 to open his own studio. During the Republic Day celebrations in 1929 at Ankara Palace, Weinberg intentionally kicked the tripod of Cemal Işıksel, who had been awarded the distinction of "first photojournalist" in Turkey by Turkish President Mustafa Kemal Atatürk. As a result, Weinberg was banned from taking photographs of Atatürk.

On 11 June 1932 the Turkish parliament passed Act 2007 Concerning Arts and Occupations Reserved for Turkish Citizens in Turkey, which prohibited foreign photographers from working in Turkey. Consequently, both Pferschy and Weinberg made plans to move to Alexandria. In 1932 they went to Alexandria for a few months before returning to Istanbul with the intention of moving their studios to Egypt. Weinberg had a successful career in Egypt, where he is known to have photographed members of the Egyptian royal family at least until 1948.
