= Davicion Bally =

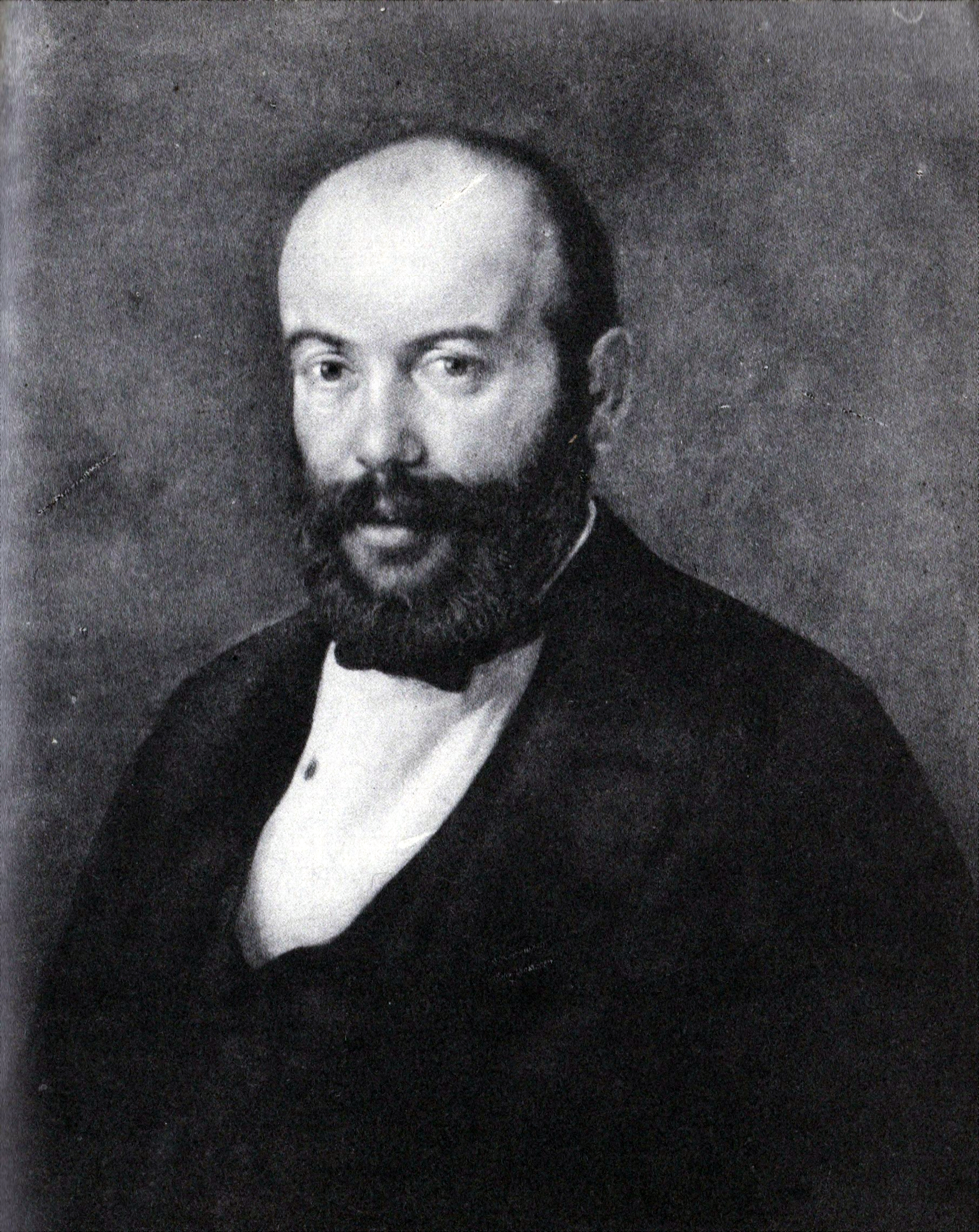
Davicion Bally by Constantin Daniel Rosenthal, 1847-1848

Davicion Bally (January 29, 1809 in Bucharest – May 2, 1884 in Jerusalem) was a Romanian Jewish public servant.

== Early life and public service ==
His great-grandfather, Chelebi Mentesh Bally, banker to the Grand Vizier of Istanbul, aided Nicholas Mavrocordato to ascend the throne of Wallachia in 1716, and was taken by him to Bucharest, where, in recognition of his services, he was made a court counselor and received various privileges and exemption from taxation for himself and his descendants.

Bally's grandfather, Isaac, inherited the privileges of his father, and became the intimate counselor of many of the Phanariot princes: he was especially favored by Mavrogheni, whom he aided to mount the throne. His father, Abraham, studied at Leipzig, then established himself as wholesale merchant in Bucharest, and exercised considerable influence with the Boyars. When Davicion Bally was twelve years old his father died, and it seemed as if the son would have to terminate his studies at that age, for the father's partner defrauded the family out of almost all their possessions; but, thanks to an excellent library which the elder Bally left Davicion, he familiarized himself with the Romanian, Greek, French, Italian, and German languages, in addition to Spanish, which he had learned in his father's house. He also made considerable progress in the study of Hebrew.

Bally occupied himself at first in the law office of his uncle, who had studied law at Leipzig, but was soon appointed "camarash" (treasurer) of the salt magazines established in the Danube ports; in this capacity in 1829 he saved from destruction the large stores of provisions and ammunition which the Russians had gathered at Zimnicea during the war against Turkey. In recognition Tsar Nicholas I conferred upon him the Order of St. Anna, sending it personally by the hand of General Kisselef, and awarded him the privilege of trading unrestrictedly throughout the Russian empire. In 1836 Bally was appointed cashier of the "agie" (police department), an office which he occupied for ten years without any remuneration. An ardent patriot, he even frequently provided the necessary funds for his office, at the same time contributed to the establishment of the first fire-brigade in Bucharest, and maintained at his own expense a band of Italian artists who were invited to that city to foster a taste for the theater in Wallachia.

== Wallachian Revolution of 1848 ==
In 1848, Bally embraced the cause of the Revolution, and got to know its leaders. He proclaimed the Revolution before the time they had agreed, and it is said that he thereby saved the lives of some of the leaders, as he had learned that the government had become aware of their preparations, and was proceeding to crush the movement by the execution of its chief promoters. Bally rendered services to the revolutionary government, and at the risk of his life helped certain members of the fallen régime to places of safety. But the Revolution failed three months later, and Bally aided those banished, and only escaped exile himself through his close relations with certain influential Boyars. Nevertheless, he was the subject of sharp animosity, and lost the greater part of his fortune in the episode.

== Later life ==
When in 1858 there appeared in Bucharest an anti-Jewish pamphlet entitled "Prashtia" (The Sling) and issued from the printing-office of the archbishop, C. A. Rosetti, chief of the Liberal party, criticised the publication harshly in the "Românul" at Bally's request; and at the same time the latter made representations to the prince-kaimacam, requesting the confiscation of the pamphlet.

Bally was repeatedly elected member of the administrative council of the Sephardic community, and there maintained himself as a champion of reform. He had the statutes amended so as to permit a fairer representation, introduced the distribution of clothing and shoes to poor children, projected a series of reforms for the Talmud-Torah (1863), which later became a modern school, established a free-loan institution (1860), and a society for free medical attendance (1872). He found time withal for literary pursuits, and left behind him many manuscripts in Judæo-Spanish.

Troubled by what he saw as persecutions of Jews inaugurated in 1866 by his former friends and allies of the Revolution of 1848, he left Bucharest for Jerusalem in August, 1882, dying there two years later.

== Sources ==
- M. Schwarzfeld, Davicion Bally in Anuarul Pentru Israelitzi, ix. 1-29, Bucharest, 1886.S. E. Sd.
