= Iași pogrom =

1941 Holocaust events in Romania

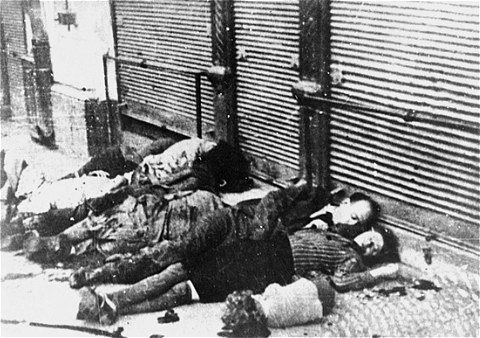
- Murdered Jews, adults and children, on a Iași street
- Location: Iași, Romania; 47°09′25″N 27°35′25″E
- Date: 28–30 June 1941
- Incident type: Genocide, mass murder, ethnic cleansing, pogrom
- Perpetrators: Ion Antonescu, Iron Guard, Romanian military and police, civilians from Iași, German military
- Victims: 13,266
- Survivors: Iancu Țucărman
- Witnesses: Viorica Agarici, Curzio Malaparte
- Documentation: 127 photographs

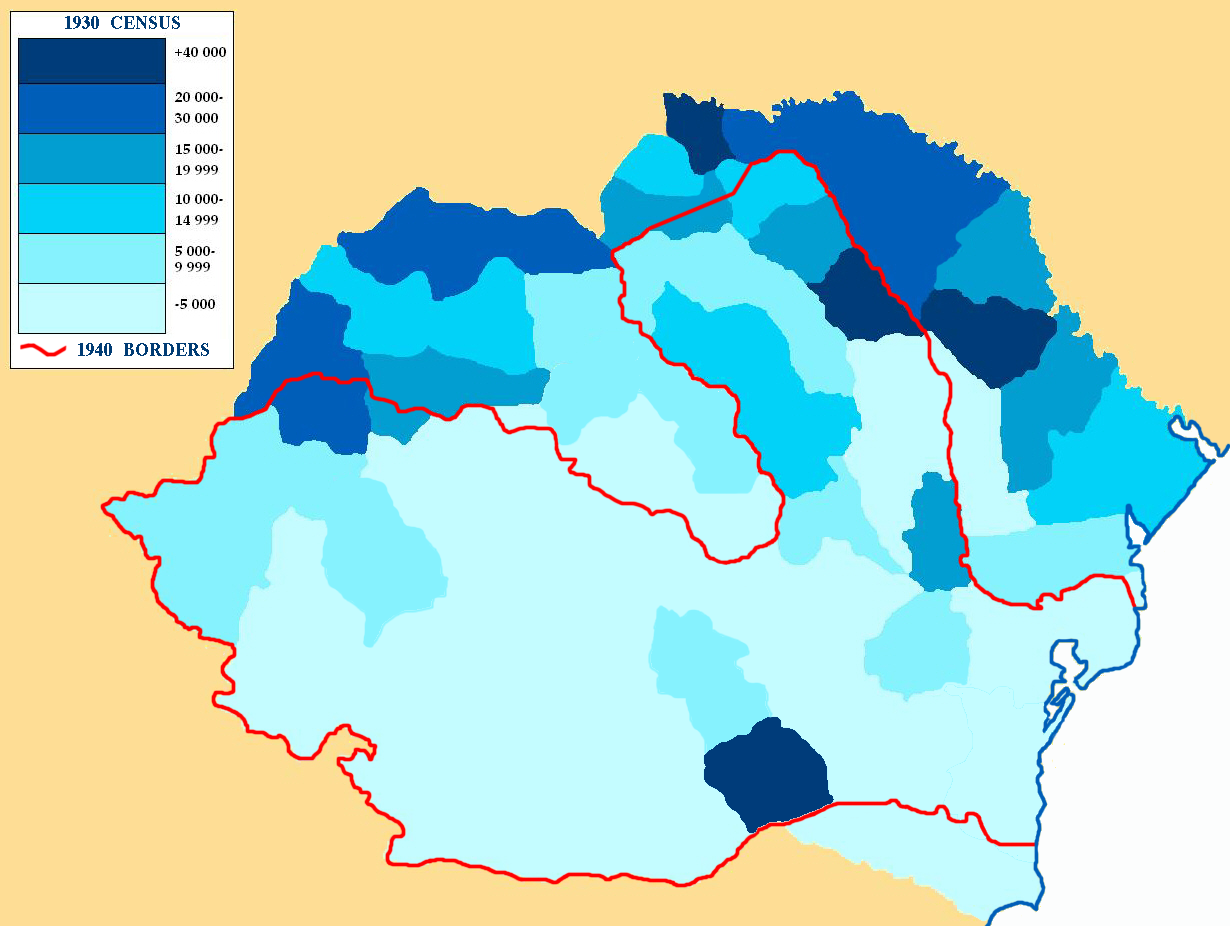
Jewish population in Romania according to the 1930 census

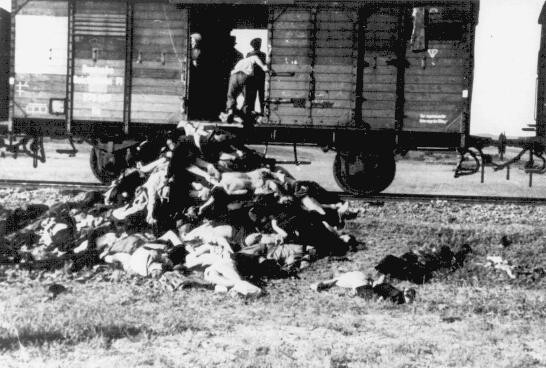
Workers remove corpses of Jewish victims deported from Iași following pogrom

The Iași pogrom (Romanian pronunciation: [ˈjaʃʲ], sometimes anglicized as Jassy) was a series of pogroms launched by governmental forces under Marshal and Leader Ion Antonescu in the Romanian city of Iași against its Jewish community, which lasted from 28 June to 30 June 1941. According to Romanian authorities, over 13,266 people, or one third of the Jewish population, were massacred in the pogrom itself or in its aftermath, and many were deported. It was one of the worst pogroms during World War II.

== Background ==
During World War II, from 1940 to 1944, Romania was an ally of Nazi Germany, and echoed its antisemitic policies. During 1941 and 1942, 32 laws, 31 decree-laws, and 17 government resolutions, all sharply antisemitic, were published in the Official Gazette (Monitorul Oficial). Romania also joined Germany in the invasion of the Soviet Union, initially with the purpose of regaining Bessarabia, taken by Soviets in 1940, after the Molotov–Ribbentrop Pact.

== Organising the pogrom ==
It was widely believed in interwar Romania that Communism was the work of the Jews, and Romania's coming entry into the war against the Soviet Union – a war billed as a struggle to "annihilate" the forces of "Judeo-Bolshevism" – greatly served to increase the antisemitic paranoia of the Iron Guard regime. Operation Barbarossa, as the invasion of the Soviet Union was code-named, was scheduled to begin on 22 June 1941. Iași, a city with a large Jewish population located close to the Soviet border, was considered a problem by the dictator Marshal Ion Antonescu, as he saw the Jews of Iași as a fifth column which would sabotage the Romanian war effort. In mid-June 1941, Antonescu ordered that "all the Judeo-Communist coffee shops in Moldavia be closed down, all kikes, Communist agents and sympathizers be identified by region". On 21 June 1941, Antonescu signed a decree calling for all Jews between the ages of 18 and 60 who lived between the Siret and Pruth rivers to be deported to the concentration camp at Târgu Jiu in the south of Romania. Officers of both the Romanian and German armies, poised to invade the Soviet Union, saw the Jews near the Soviet border as a major internal security threat and pressed the Romanian government to remove this alleged threat. Lieutenant-Colonel Traian Borcescu of the Special Information Service (Serviciul Special de Informații, SSI), as the Romanian secret service was known, later recalled: "I know for certain that Section II of the Supreme Headquarters was involved with the problem of moving the Jewish population in Moldavia under the auspices of the respective statistics offices, with Colonel Gheorghe Petrescu in charge of this activity". Section II of the Romanian Supreme Headquarters was concerned with monitoring all political parties and all of the ethnic minorities in Romania. The responsibility for organising the pogrom rested with Section II, the SSI, and with the German Abwehr. After the invasion of the Soviet Union began on 22 June 1941, the SSI formed the First Operative Echelon of 160 men who were tasked with crushing any internal security threat that might hamper the war. Colonel Borcescu recalled:

One of the secret and unofficial aims of the expedition of the First Operative Echelon was to do away with the Moldavian Jews by deportation or extermination. For this purpose, SSI department head Florin Becescu-Georgescu, when leaving Bucharest, took along the files on the Jews and Communists. From Iași, the Echelon drove to Chișinău, where the Jews were massacred. The same SSI teams that operated in Iași operated in Chișinău as well. The Echelon went also to Tighina and Tiraspol, where it committed robberies and to Odessa, where it committed massacres.

On the same day that Operation Barbarossa began, the police force in Iași released imprisoned members of the Iron Guard, who had been held since a failed coup by the Legion in January 1941. The newly freed Legionnaires were placed under police command and provided with weapons. Since the Iron Guard was notorious for its virulent antisemitism, the release of the imprisoned Iron Guard members suggested that the authorities were already planning to strike against the Jews of Iași. On 24 June 1941, Iași was bombed by the Soviet Air Force. The raid did little damage, but it produced a hysterical reaction, with rumors flying fast that the entire Jewish population of Iași were Communist Party members and had lit beacons to guide the Soviet bombers. On 26 June, Iași was again bombed and this time substantial damage was inflicted on the city. The second bombing killed about 600 people, of whom 38 were Jews. Again, the bombing led to rampant rumors of alleged Jewish fifth column activity in the service of the Soviet Union. The same day saw the arrival in Iași of Major Hermann von Stransky of the Abwehr and of Colonel Ionescu Micandru of the SSI – the two men whom witnesses at post-war trials consistently described as the main instigators of the pogrom. On June 27, 1941, Ion Antonescu telephoned Col. Constantin Lupu, commander of the Iași garrison, telling him formally to "cleanse Iași of its Jewish population". The plans for the pogrom had been laid even earlier.

Rumors had already been circulating, backed up by the state-run press, that stated that Soviet parachutists had landed outside of Iași and that the Jews were working with them. In the week before the pogrom, the signs grew more ominous: houses were marked with crosses if the residents were Christian, Jewish men were forced to dig large ditches in the Jewish cemetery, and soldiers started to break into Jewish homes "searching for evidence". On June 27, the authorities officially accused the Jewish community of sabotage, and assembled the soldiers and police who would spearhead the pogrom, where they were falsely told that Jews had attacked soldiers in the streets.

Marcel, a Jewish survivor from Iași recounted:

I remember that the real danger for the Jews started on June 29, 1941. It was a big surprise for all the Jews. We were forced to wear the yellow stars of David on our clothes. We could not buy or sell food anymore. For certain hours, we didn't have access to some public places. At that time there were cellars where Jews hid. It was difficult for the police to search the cellars. So, in order to make us come to the commissariat, they distributed a sort of ticket with the word "Free" written on it in a Jewish district. The Jews thought that if they showed up at the commissariat they could be set free, could again buy commodities. But it was a trap – instead of receiving freedom, we met death.

== Pogrom and death train ==
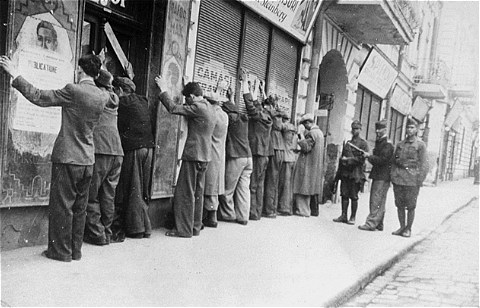
Jews of Iași being rounded up and arrested during the pogrom

According to a report commissioned and accepted by the Romanian government, the participation in the pogrom that followed was widespread:

Those participating in the manhunt launched on the night of June 28/29 were, first and foremost, the Iași police, backed by the Bessarabia police and gendarmerie units. Other participants were army soldiers, young people armed by SSI agents, and mobs who robbed and killed, knowing they would not have to account for their actions. ... In addition to informing on Jews, directing soldiers to Jewish homes and refuges, and even breaking into homes themselves, some Romanian residents of Iași also took part in the arrests and humiliation forced upon the convoys of Jews on their way to the Chestură (Police Headquarters). The perpetrators included neighbors of Jews, known and lesser-known supporters of antisemitic movements, students, poorly-paid, low-level officials, railway workers, craftsmen frustrated by Jewish competition, "white-collar" workers, retirees and military veterans.

Soon Romanian soldiers, police, and mobs started massacring Romanian Jews; at least 8,000 were killed in the initial pogrom. SSI agents played a major role in leading the pogrom, often accompanied by soldiers and policemen. The newly freed Iron Guards indulged in their bloodthirsty brand of antisemitism, leading mobs that stabbed or beat to death with crow-bars Jews on the streets of Iași. On rare occasions when the Legionaires felt merciful, they merely shot the Romanian Jews. One eyewitness later testified:

Sometimes, those who attempted to defend the Jews were killed with them. This was the case with engineer Naum, a gentile, brother-in-law of Chief Public Prosecutor Casian. Naum, a former Assistant Professor of Medical Chemistry at the Iași Institute of Hygiene, well-known in select circles as an eloquent defender of liberal views, attempted to save a Jew on Păcurari Street, outside the Ferdinand Foundation. The Romanian officer who was about to kill the Jew said to Naum, 'You dog, die with the kike you are defending!', and shot him point-blank. The priest Răzmeriță was shot on Sărărie Street while attempting to save several Jews, dying with the victims he was trying to protect. While trying to defend some Jews on Zugravilor Street, outside Rampa, the lathe operator Ioan Gheorghiu was killed by railroad workers.

The Italian journalist Curzio Malaparte, who witnessed the pogrom first-hand, wrote about how "detachments of soldiers and gendarmes, groups of working men and women, groups of long-haired Gypsies squabbled, shouting with joy, as they undressed the corpses, lifted them and turned them over."

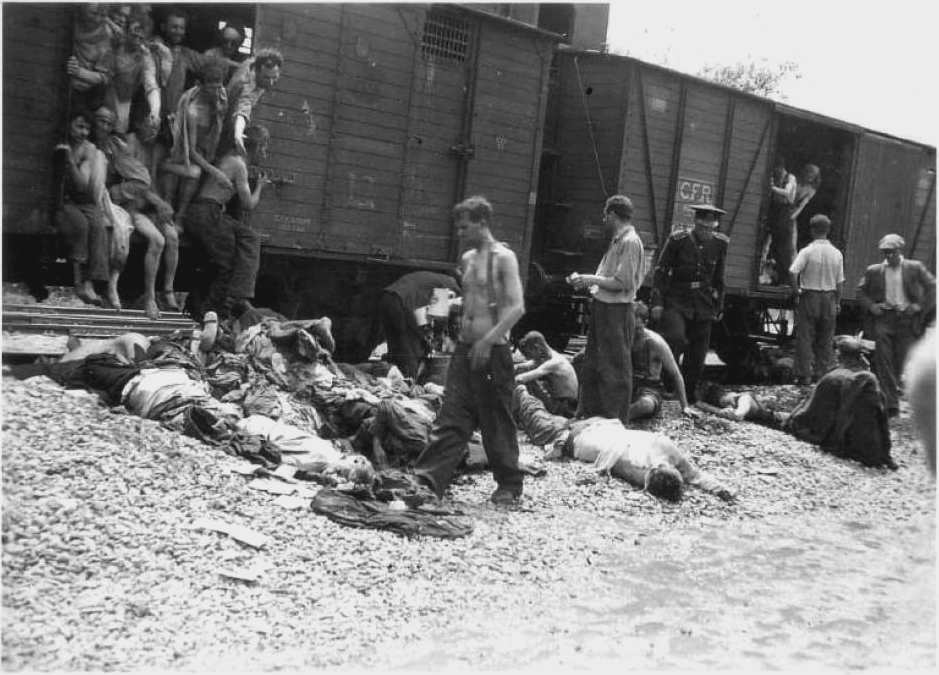
Bodies being thrown down from the death train

The Romanian authorities also arrested more than 5,000 Romanian Jews, forcing them to the railway station, shooting those who did not move quickly enough, and then robbing them of all of their possessions. Over 100 people were stuffed into each car. Many Jews died of thirst, starvation, and suffocation aboard two trains that for eight days travelled back and forth across the countryside. According to the official report:

In the death train that left Iași for Călărași, southern Romania, which carried perhaps as many as 5,000 Jews, only 1,011 reached their destination alive after seven days. (The Romanian police counted 1,258 bodies, yet hundreds of dead were thrown out of the train on the way at Mircești, Roman, Săbăoani, and Inotești.) The death train to Podu Iloaiei (15 kilometers from Iași) had up to 2,700 Jews upon departure, of which only 700 disembarked alive. In the official account, Romanian authorities reported that 1,900 Jews boarded the train and "only" 1,194 died.

A series of photographs of Jews killed during the pogrom.

Some were deported by train to Podu Iloaei, southwest of Iași. The total number of victims of the Iași pogrom is unknown, but the figure is calculated to be over 13,266 identified victims by the Romanian government, and nearly 15,000 by the Jewish community of Iași.

In the midst of the brutality, there were also notable exceptions – for example, in the town of Roman, by Viorica Agarici, chairman of the local Red Cross during World War II and one of the 54 Romanian Righteous Among the Nations commemorated by the Israeli people at Yad Vashem. On the night of 2 July 1941, after caring for the wounded of the Romanian Army coming from the Russian front, she overheard people moaning from a train transporting Jewish survivors of the Iași pogrom. Taking advantage of her position, she asked and received permission to give food and water to those unfortunate passengers. Her actions were strongly condemned by the community of Roman and she had to move to Bucharest. Her story, as part of the story of the pogrom and its consequences, was vividly presented in the book "Pogrom", written by Eugen Luca. The book was originally published in Romanian, was then translated into both Hebrew and Czech, and can be found at Yad Vashem and at the Library of the Holocaust Museum in Washington, D.C.

Unlike the Nazi German evacuations and exterminations, which involved black-ops, secrecy and deceit, the Iași pogrom was perpetrated by Romanian authorities and the Romanian Army in "broad daylight".

== War crimes trials ==
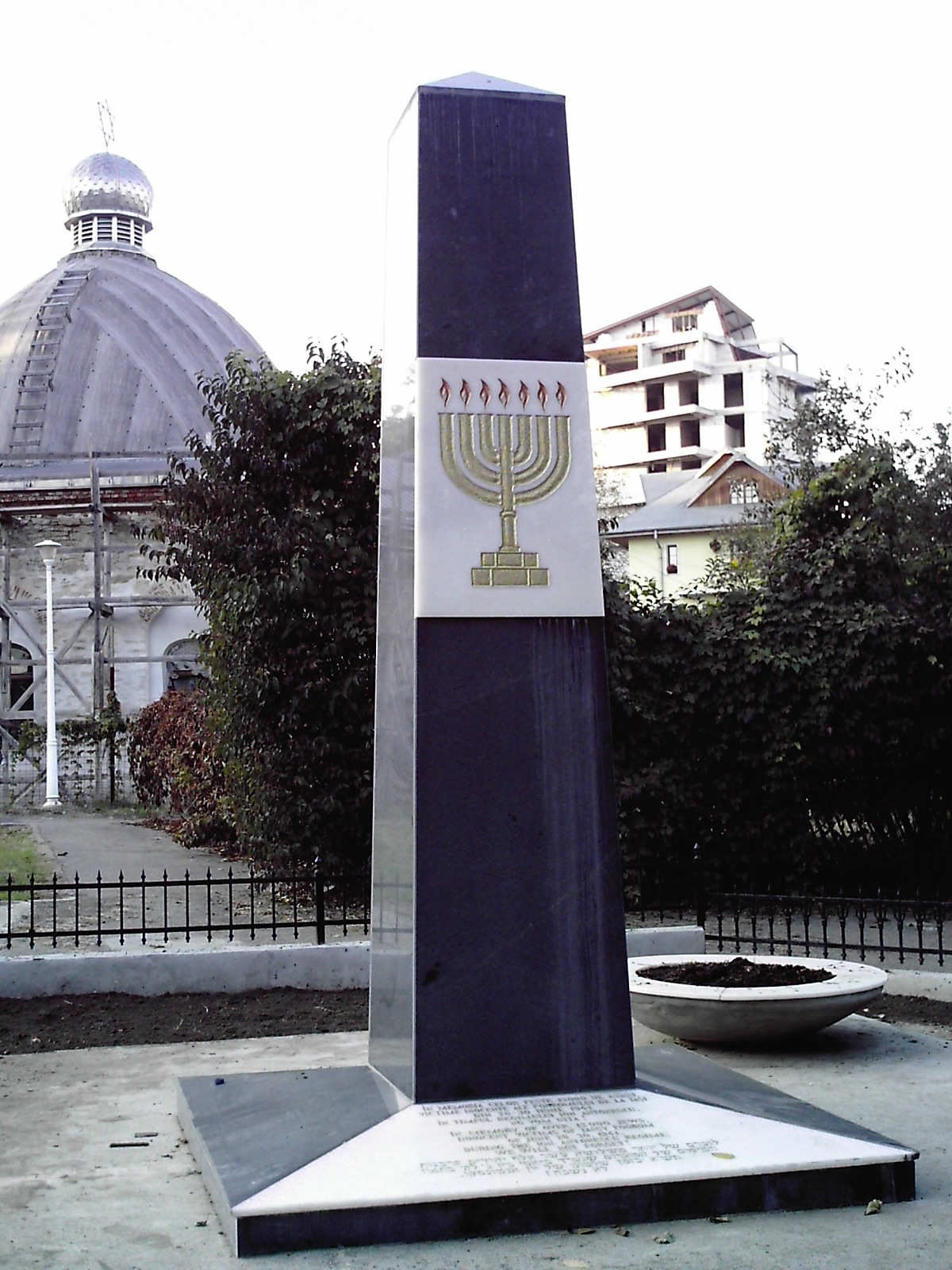
The monument erected in Iași in memory of the pogrom victims

The Romanian People's Tribunals were conducted in 1946 and a total of 57 people were tried for the Iași pogroms: eight from the higher military echelons, the prefect of Iași county and the mayor of Iași, four military figures, 21 civilians and 22 gendarmes. One hundred sixty-five witnesses, mostly survivors of the pogrom, were called to the stand.

The majority of those sentenced under war crimes and crimes against peace (article 2 of Law no. 291/1947), 23 people (including generals and colonels), received life sentences with hard labor and were fined 100 million lei in damages. Ion Antonescu, the Conducător, who ordered the pogrom, was executed. One colonel received a life sentence in harsh conditions and was fined 100 million lei in damages. The next-largest group, 12 accused, were sentenced to 20 years hard labor each. Sentences of 25 years hard labor were received by seven accused. Smaller groups received a 20-year harsh sentence and 15 years hard labor, and one accused was sentenced to five years hard labor. Several accused were acquitted.

Among the rehabilitated perpetrators were Colonels Radu Dinulescu and Gheorghe Petrescu, who were both irreversibly acquitted in 1997. As archival documents subsequently revealed, these two high-ranking officers were indeed involved in the deportations to Transnistria and in the persecution of tens of thousands of Jews from Bessarabia and Bukovina.

Germany agreed to pay reparations to survivors of the Iași pogrom only in 2017.

== See also ==
- Cattle wagon
- Gruber's Journey
- History of the Jews in Iași
- History of the Jews in Romania
- Legionnaires' Rebellion and Bucharest Pogrom
- Wiesel Commission
- The Death Train 2020 documentary featuring survivors of the Iasi pogrom

== Bibliography ==
- Ioanid, Radu (July 1993). "The Holocaust in Romania: The Iasi Pogrom of June 1941". Contemporary European History. 2 (2): 119–148. doi:10.1017/S0960777300000394.
