= Great Synagogue (Iași) =

Synagogue in Iași, Romania

Great Synagogue of Iași
- Romanian: Sinagoga Mare din Iași
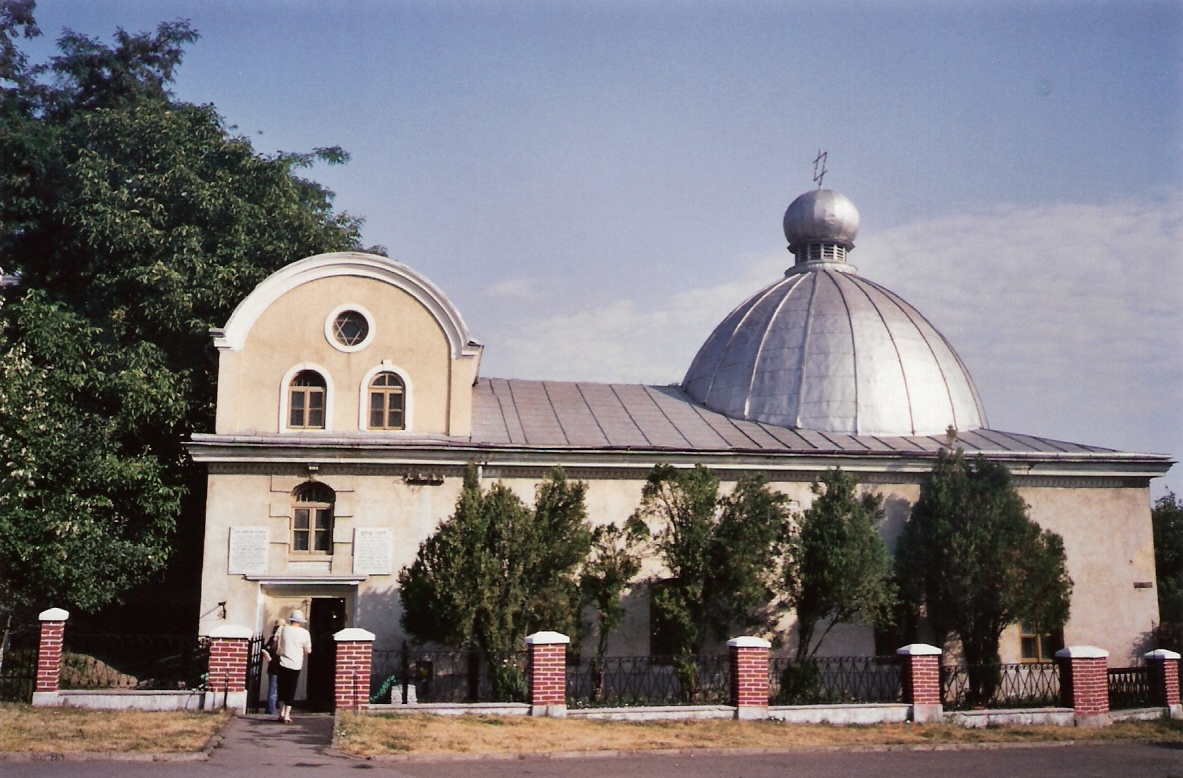
- The synagogue, in 2002

- Location of the synagogue in Romania

Religion
- Affiliation: Judaism
- Rite: Nusach Ashkenaz
- Ecclesiastical or organizational status: Synagogue
- Status: Active

Location
- Location: 1 Sinagogilor Street, Iași, Iași County, Western Moldavia
- Country: Romania
- Interactive map of Great Synagogue of Iași
- Coordinates: 47°09′56″N 27°35′32″E

Architecture
- Type: Synagogue architecture
- Style: Baroque
- Established: c. 1650 (as a congregation)
- Groundbreaking: 1657
- Completed: Original: 1671; Rebuilt/restored: 1761, 1822, 1863, 1977 (after earthquake), 2018

Specifications
- Dome: One
- Dome height (inner): 9.8 metres (32 ft)
- Materials: Brick

Monument istoric
- Official name: Iași: Sinagoga Mare
- Type: Monumente de arhitectură
- Designated: sec. XVIII
- Reference no.: IS-II-m-B-04057

The Great Synagogue of Iași (Romanian: Sinagoga Mare din Iași) is a Jewish congregation and synagogue, located at 1 Sinagogilor Street, in Iași, in the Iași County, of Western Moldavia, Romania. The synagogue was completed in 1671 in the Baroque style, and it is the oldest surviving synagogue in Romania.

The synagogue is listed on the National Register of Historic Monuments and in 2014 was included on the watchlist of World Monuments Fund.

== History and architecture ==
Raised in 1671, the Great Synagogue is a free standing building adjacent to a small garden off Cucu Street (once called Sinagogilor Street for the many synagogues located on it) just north of the city center in the old Jewish neighbourhood of Târgu Cucului. The synagogue underwent major renovations in 1761, 1822 and 1864. It was partly restored in the 1970s and a major restoration took place between 2006 and 2018. The Women's Gallery houses a small museum of the Jewish community of Iași.

The building has round-arched windows, and two wings. One wing is two stories high and capped by a barrel-vaulted ceiling. The other is a tall, single-story hall with a 9.8-metre (32 ft) diameter dome capped with a lantern. The dome was added to the building in the early 20th century.

Of the more than 110 synagogues in Iași before World War II, the Great Synagogue is one of only two which continues to serve the dwindling Jewish community of Iași, following the Holocaust.

== See also ==
- History of the Jews in Iași
- History of the Jews in Romania
- List of synagogues in Romania
