= Iancu Țucărman =

Romanian Jewish Holocaust and Iași pogrom survivor

- Born: 30 October 1922; Iași, Romania
- Died: 8 January 2021 (aged 98); Bucharest, Romania
- Burial place: Giurgiului Jewish Cemetery of Bucharest
- Occupation: Agricultural engineer
- Known for: Surviving the Holocaust and the Iași pogrom
- Awards: National Order of Merit (2007); Honorary citizenship of Iași (2011); National Order of Faithful Service in the "Knight" rank (2016)

Iancu Țucărman (30 October 1922 – 8 January 2021) was a Romanian Jewish agricultural engineer and survivor of the Holocaust and the Iași pogrom. He was the penultimate survivor of the "Death's Train" (Trenul morții) that was used to deport Jews from the Iași railway station after Leonard Zăicescu. Țucărman was buried at the Giurgiului Jewish Cemetery of Bucharest on 11 January 2021.

Țucărman received several awards and honours in his lifetime. In 2007, President of Romania Traian Băsescu gave him the National Order of Merit. Later, in 2011, Țucărman was given honorary citizenship of the city of Iași. Finally, in 2016, Romanian President Klaus Iohannis gave him the National Order of Faithful Service in the rank of "Knight".

He died on 8 January 2021, at age 98, after getting infected by COVID-19 during the COVID-19 pandemic in Romania.

== See also ==
- List of Holocaust survivors
- History of the Jews in Romania
- Holocaust trains
