= Iași =

City and county seat of Iași County, Romania

- County seat and Municipality
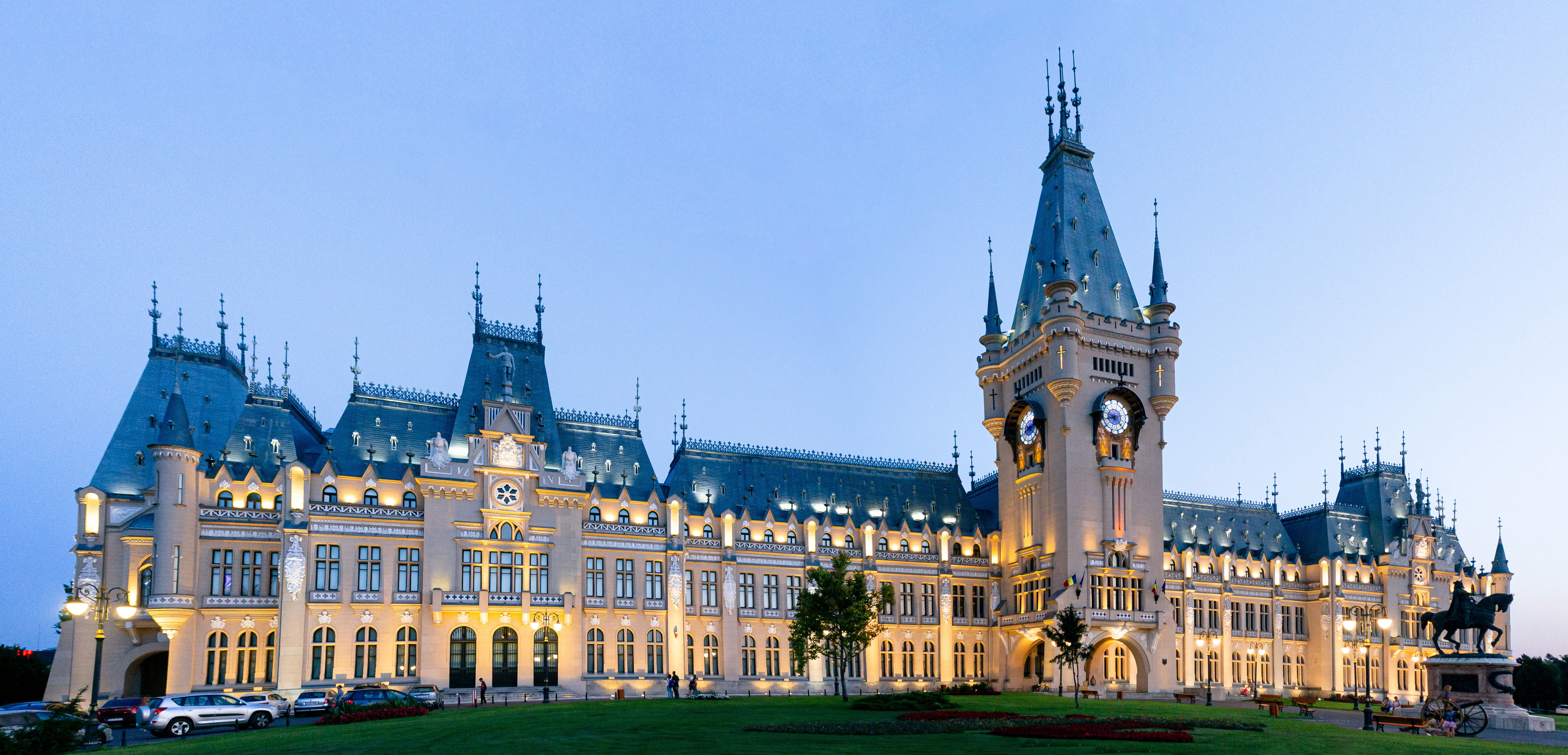
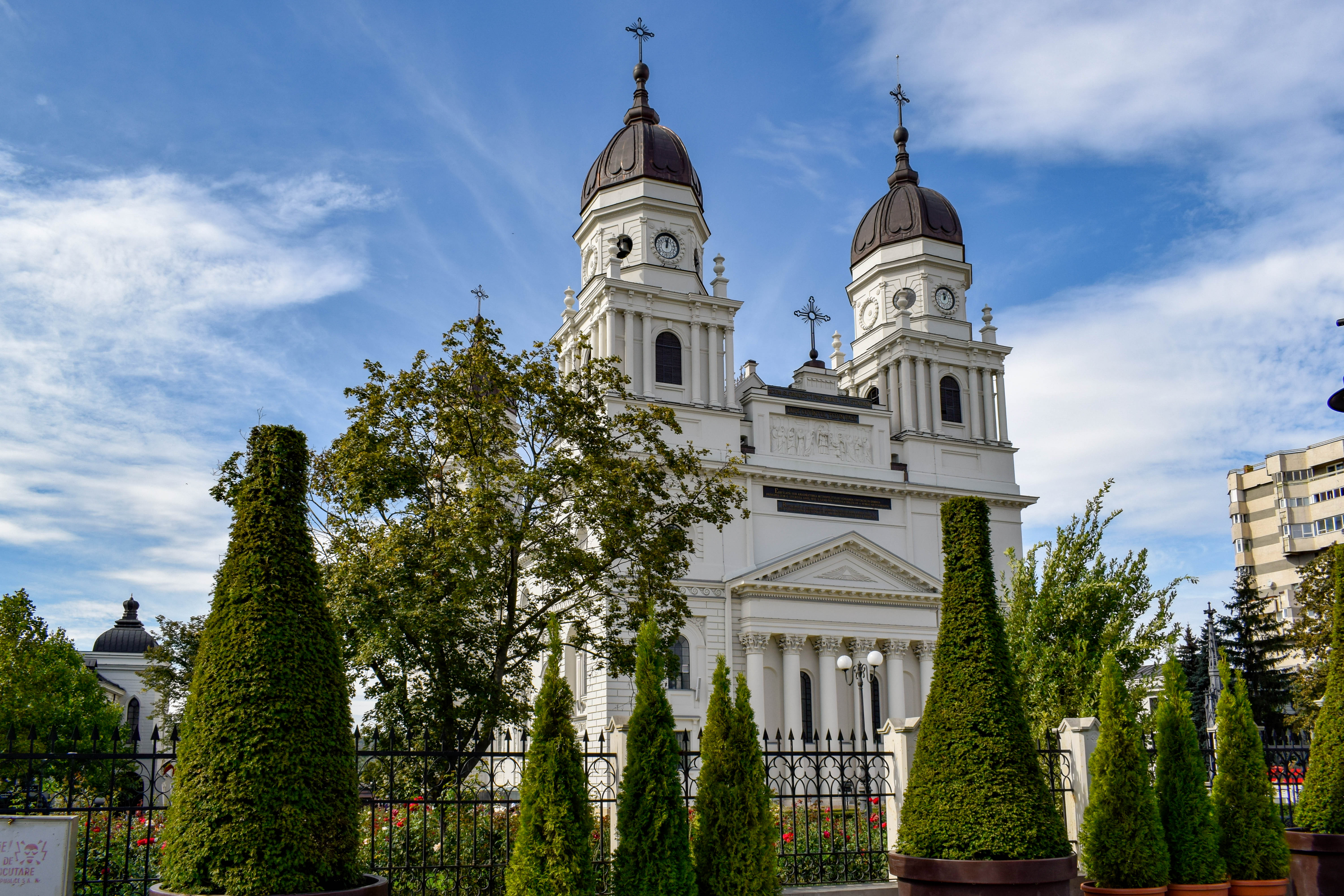
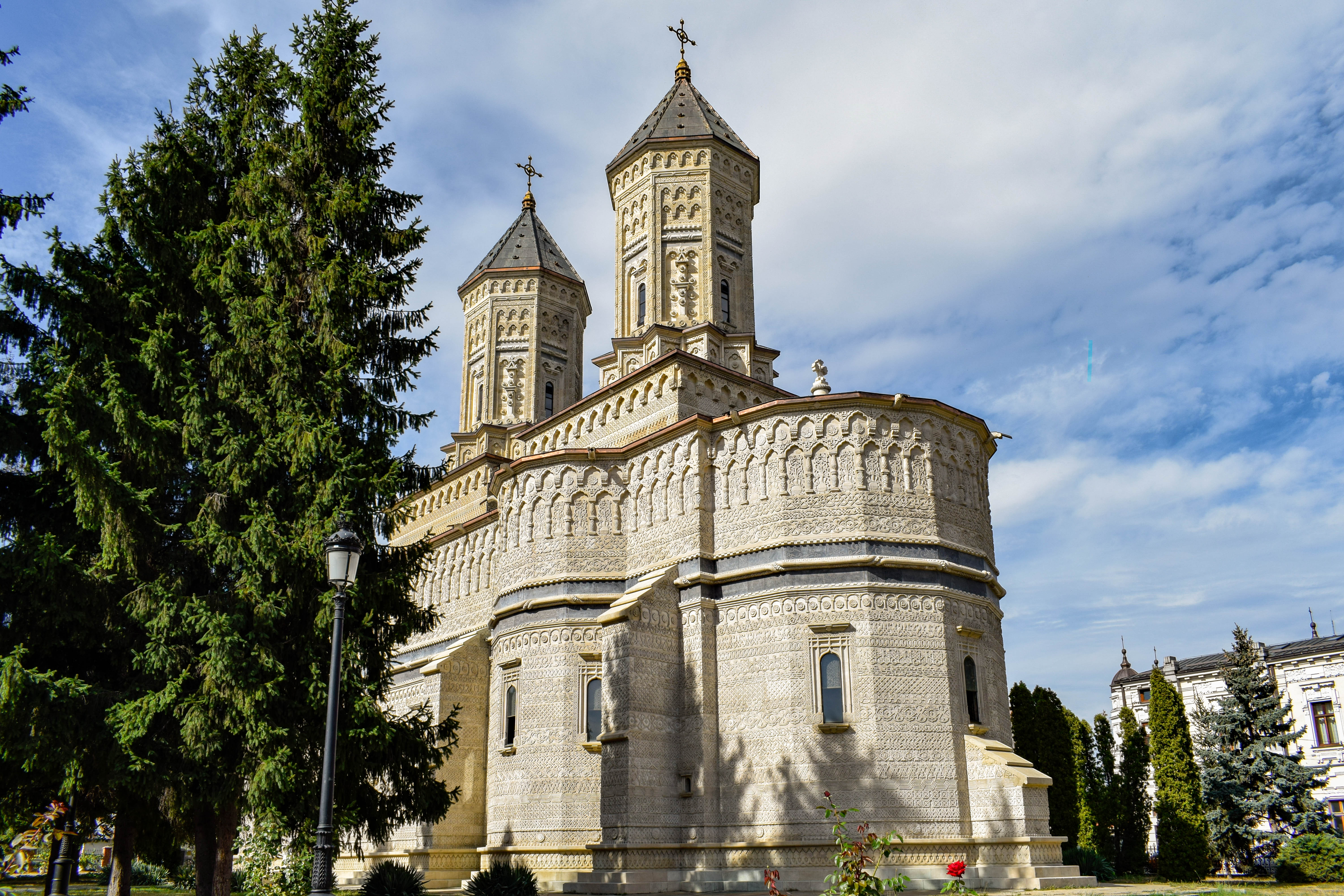
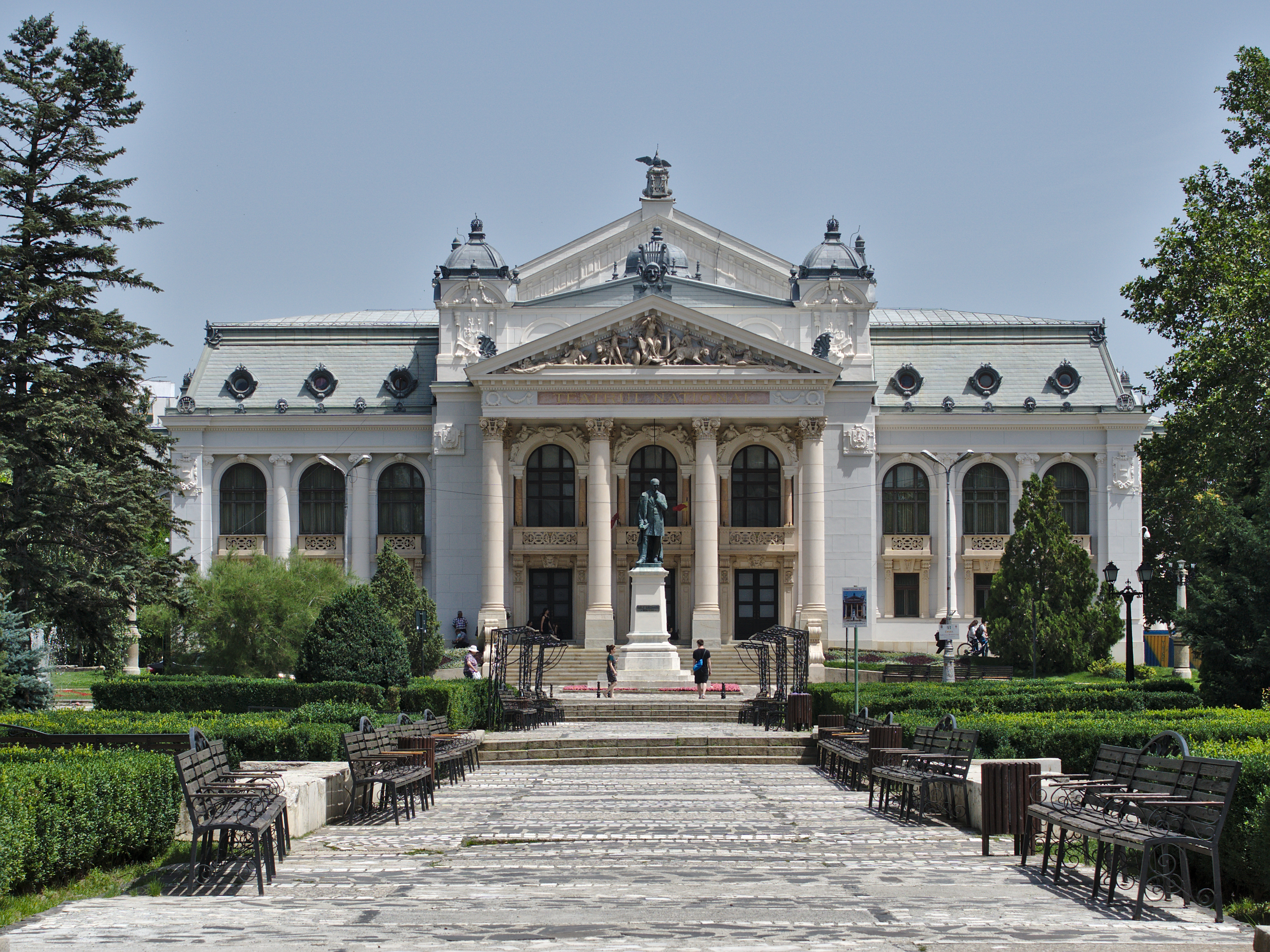
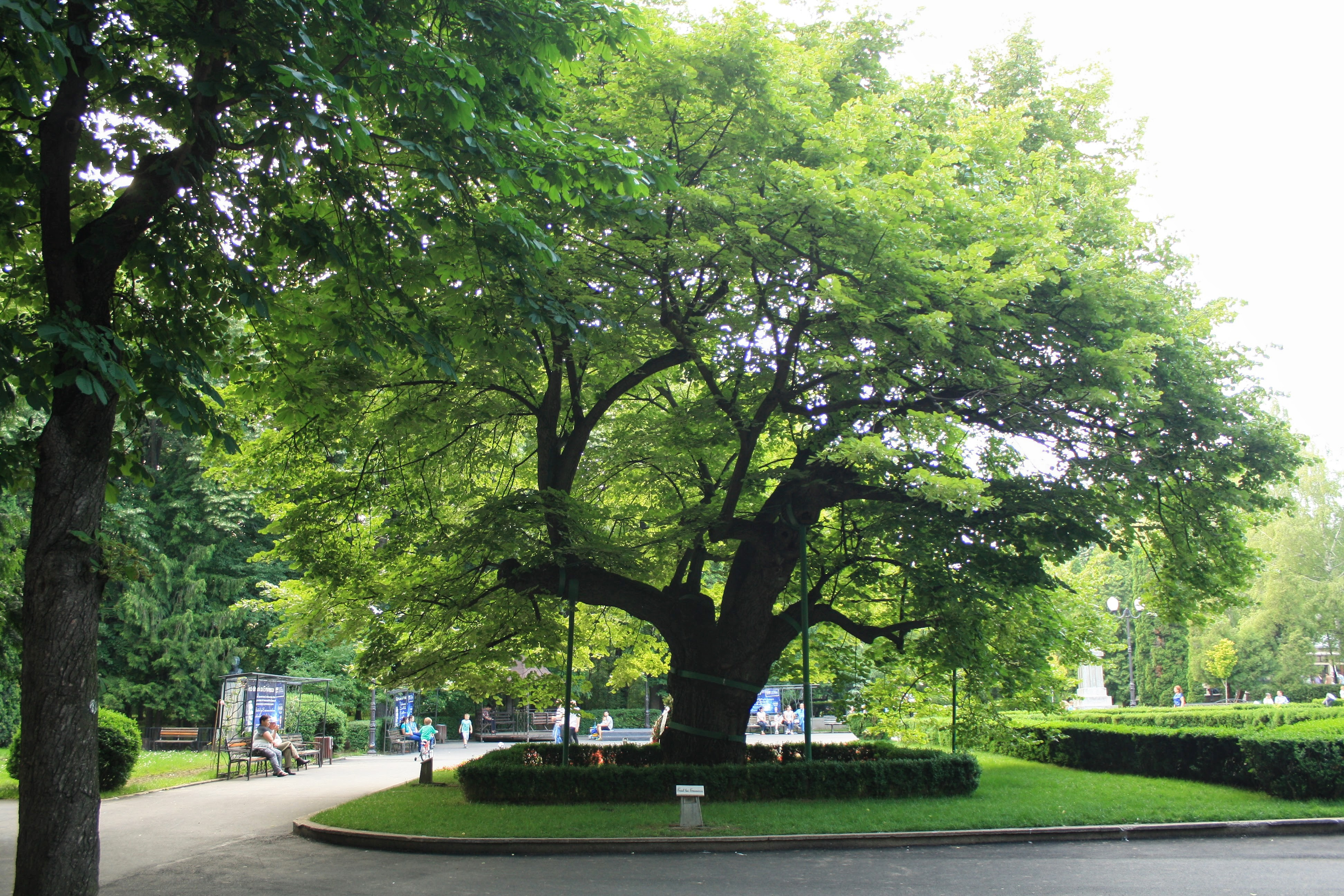
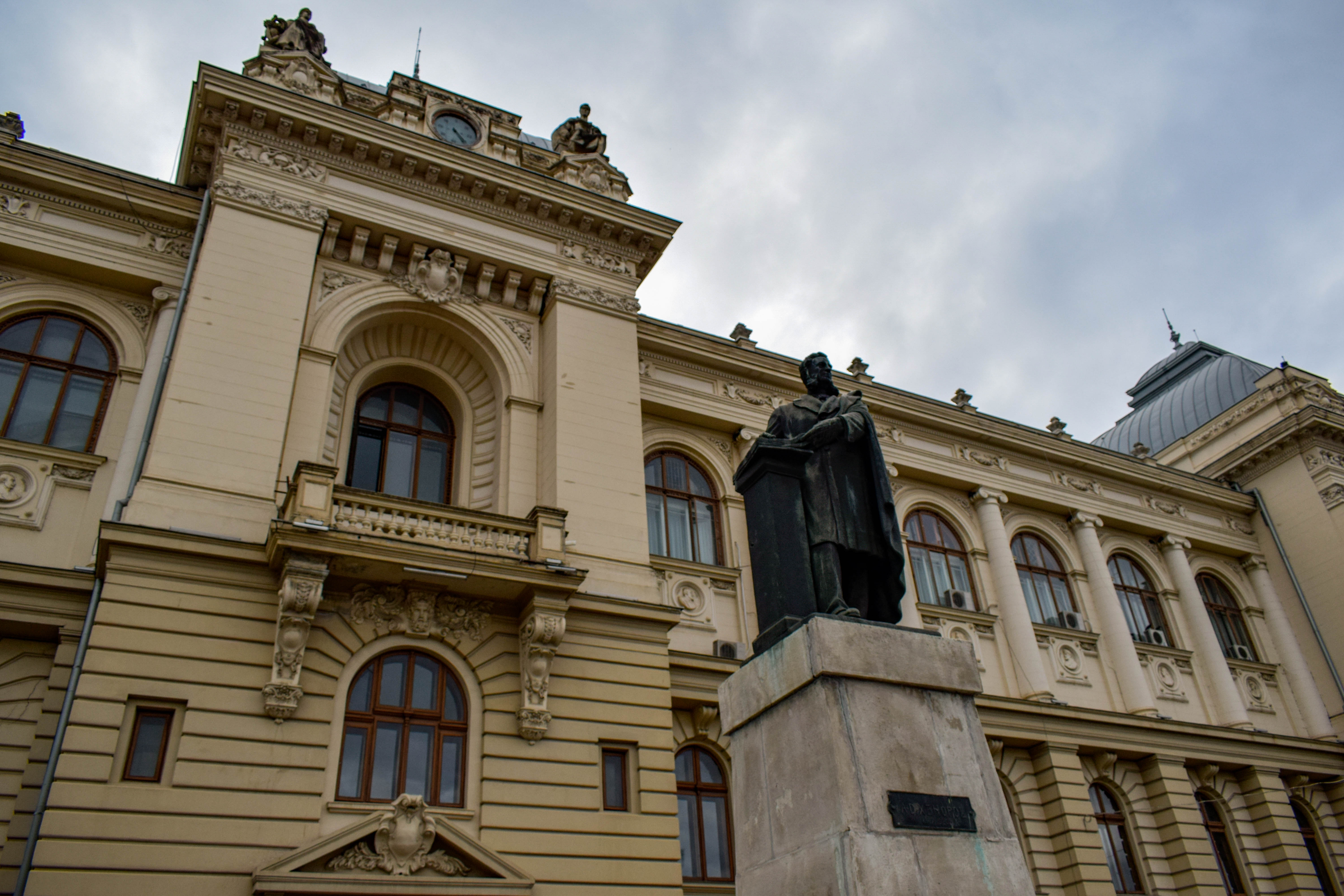
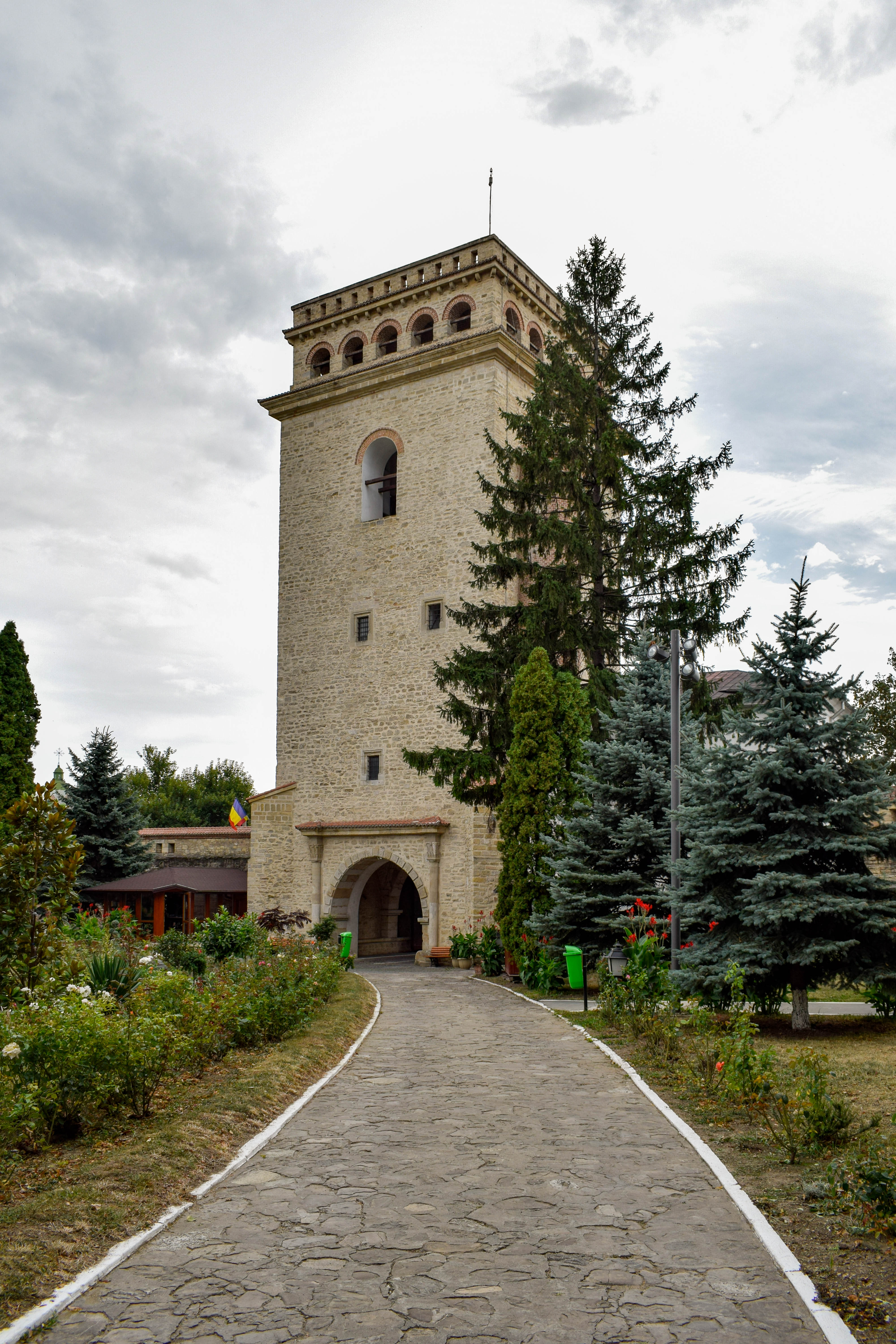
- Palace of Culture Iași Metropolitan Cathedral Trei Ierarhi Monastery Vasile Alecsandri National Theater Eminescu's Linden Tree Alexandru Ioan Cuza University Golia Tower

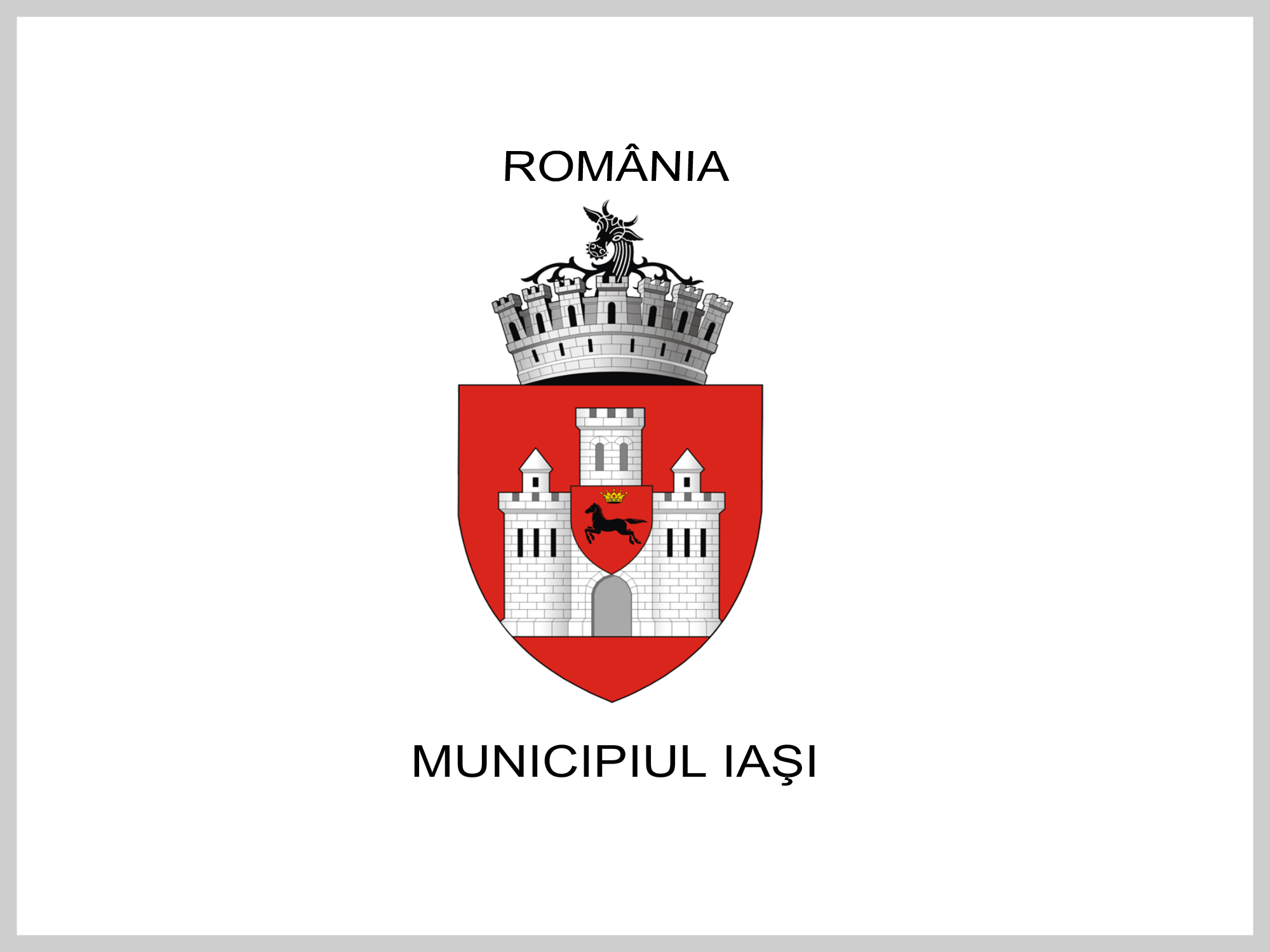
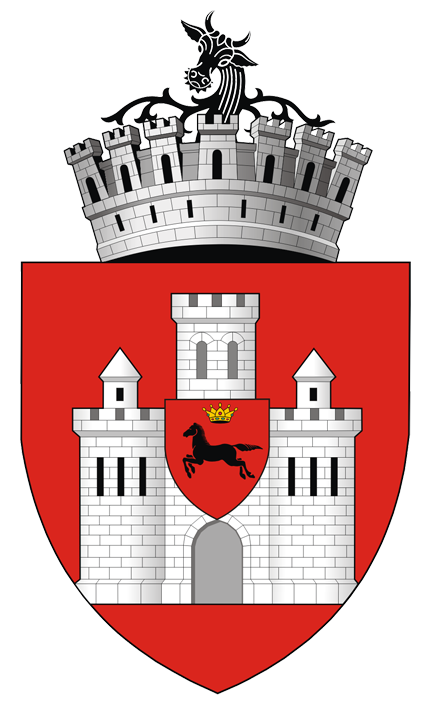
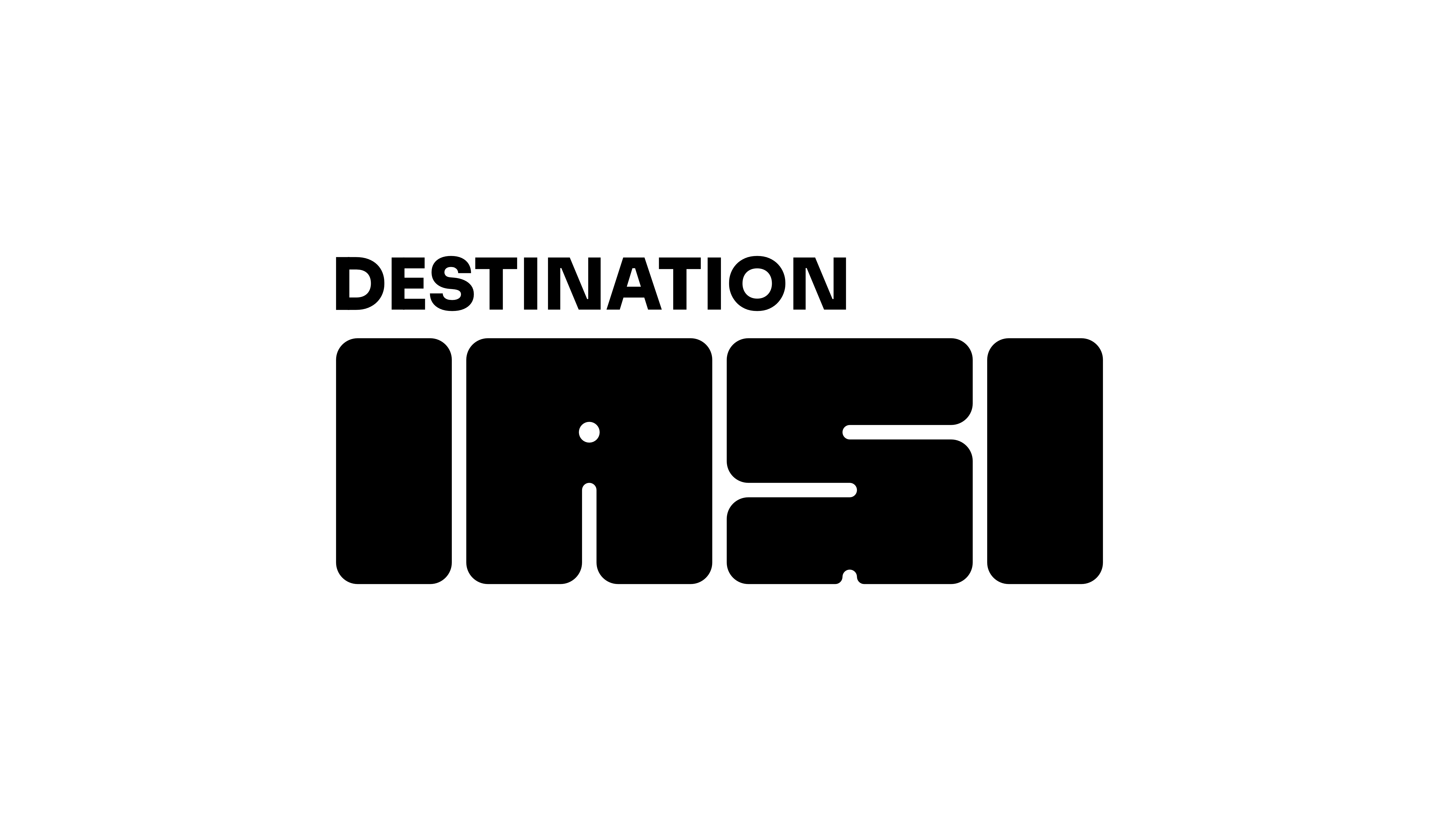
- Flag Coat of arms Brandmark
- Nicknames: The City of Great Loves, The City of the Famous Destinies, The City of Great Ideas, The City of the Three Unions, The City on Seven Hills
- Location of Iași inside Iași County

- Location in Romania
- Coordinates: 47°09′44″N 27°35′20″E
- Country: Romania
- County: Iași
- Status: County seat
- Settled: Before 14th century
- First official record: 1408

Government
  - Mayor (2024–2028): Mihai Chirica (PNL)

Area
  - County seat and Municipality: 93.9 km^{2} (36.3 sq mi)
  - Metro: 1,159 km^{2} (447 sq mi)
- Elevation: 60 m (200 ft)

Population (2021)
  - County seat and Municipality: 271,692
  - Rank: 3rd in Romania
  - Density: 2,894/km^{2} (7,500/sq mi)
  - Urban: 500,668
  - Metro: 423,154
- Demonym(s): ieșean, ieșeancă (ro)
- Time zone: UTC+2 (EET)
  - Summer (DST): UTC+3 (EEST)
- Postal Code: 700xxx
- Area code: +40 x32
- Car Plates: IS
- Climate: Dfb
- Website: www.primaria-iasi.ro

Iași (UK: /ˈjæʃ(i)/ YASH(-ee), US: /ˈjɑːʃ(i)/ YAHSH(-ee), Romanian: [ˈjaʃʲ]; also known by other alternative names), also sometimes referred to historically as Jassy (UK: /ˈjæsi/ YASS-ee, US: /ˈjɑːsi/ YAH-see), is the third most-populous city in Romania and the seat of Iași County. Located in the historical region of Moldavia, it has traditionally been one of the leading centres of Romanian social, cultural, academic and artistic life. The city was the capital of the Principality of Moldavia from 1564 to 1859, then of the United Principalities from 1859 to 1862, and the capital of Romania from 1916 to 1918.

Known as the Cultural Capital of Romania, Iași is a symbol of Romanian history. Historian Nicolae Iorga stated that "there should be no Romanian who does not know of it." Still referred to as "The Moldavian Capital," Iași is the main economic and business centre of Romania's Moldavian region. In December 2018, Iași was officially declared the Historical Capital of Romania. At the 2021 census, the city-proper had a population of 271,692, its metropolitan area had a population of 423,154, whereas more than 500,000 people live within its peri-urban area. Counting 500,668 residents (as of 2018), the Iași urban area is the second most populous in Romania after Bucharest. Official demographic data show that the Iași metropolitan area had surpassed 613,000 residents by 2025.

Home to the oldest Romanian university and to the first engineering school, Iași is the third most important education and research centre of the country, accommodating over 60,000 students in five public universities. The social and cultural life revolves around the Vasile Alecsandri National Theatre (the oldest in Romania), the Moldova State Philharmonic, the Opera House, the Iași Athenaeum, the Botanical Garden (the oldest and largest in Romania), the Central University Library (the oldest in Romania), the cultural centres and festivals, an array of museums, memorial houses, religious and historical monuments. The city is also known as the site of the largest Romanian pilgrimage which takes place every year, in October.

== Etymology and names ==
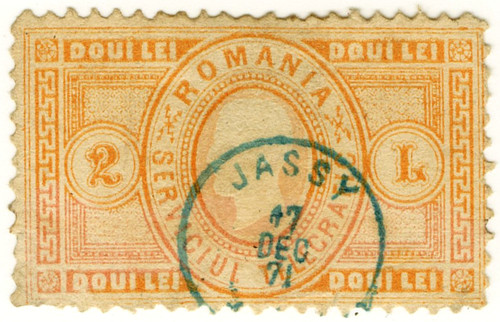
An 1871 Romanian telegraph stamp, using the historic name of Jassy

Scholars have different theories on the origin of the name Iași. Some argue that the name originates with the Sarmatian tribe Iazyges (of Iranian origin), one mentioned by Ovid as "ipse vides, onerata ferox ut ducat Iazyx/ per medias Histri plaustra bubulcus aquas" and "Iazyges et Colchi Metereaque turba Getaque/ Danubii mediis vix prohibentur aquis".

Other explanations show that the name originated from the Iranian Alanic tribe of Jassi, having the same origin with the Yazyges tribes Jassic people. In medieval times the Prut river was known as Alanus fluvius and the city as Forum Philistinorum. From this population derived the plural of the town name, Iașii.

Another historian wrote that the Iasians lived among the Cumans and that they left the Caucasus after the first Mongolian campaign in the West, settling temporarily near the Prut. He asserts that the ethnic name of Jasz which is given to the Iasians by the Hungarians has been erroneously identified with the Jazyges; also he shows that the word jasz is a Slavic loan word. The Hungarian name of the city (Jászvásár) literally means 'Jassic Market'; the antiquated Romanian name, Târgul Ieșilor (and the once-favoured Iașii), and the German Jassenmarkt, may indicate the same meaning.

== History ==
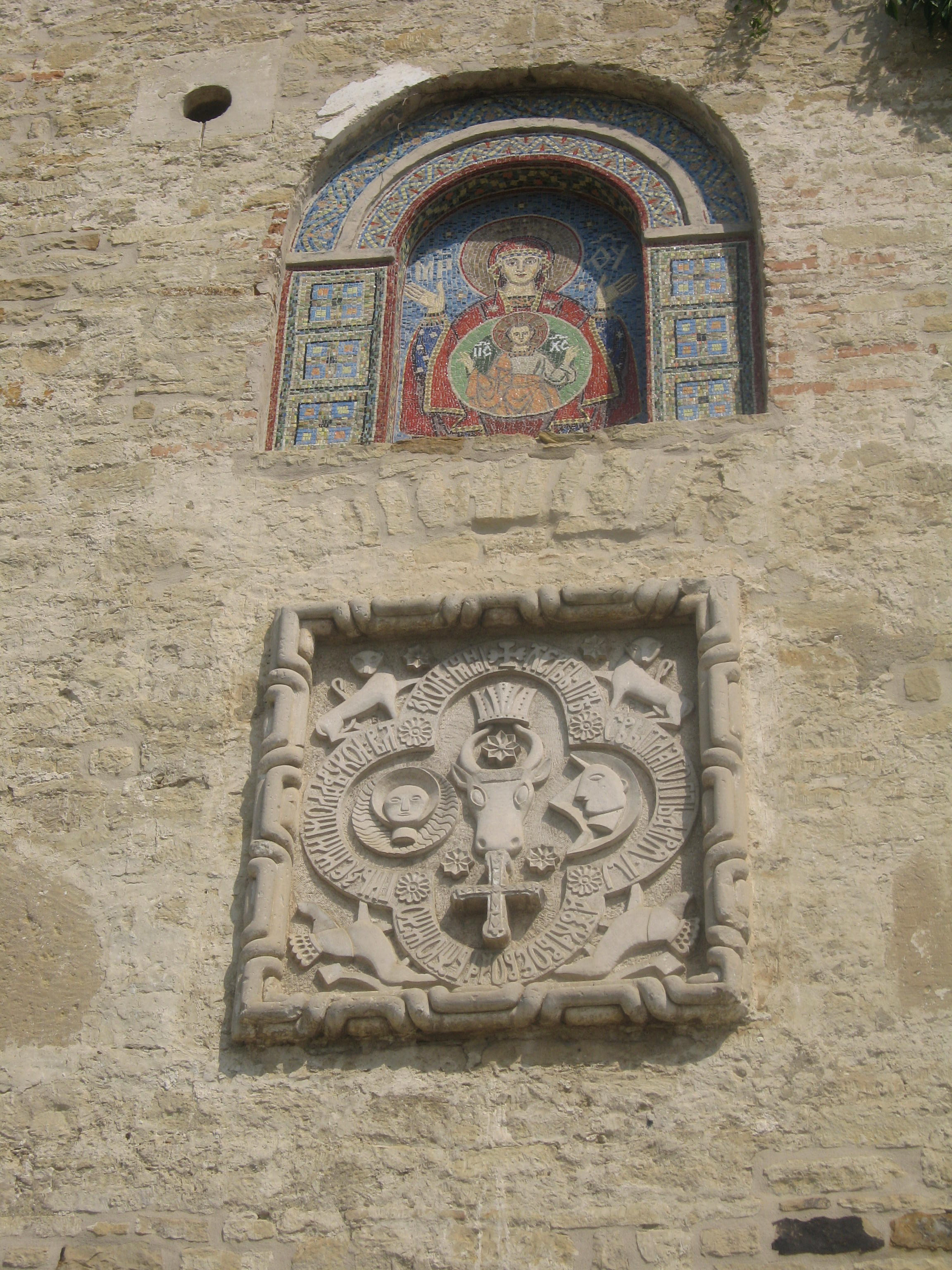
Coat of arms of the Principality of Moldavia at Cetățuia Monastery

Historical affiliations

Moldavia 1408–1859
United Principalities of Moldavia and Wallachia 1859–1862
Romania 1862–present

=== Ancient times ===
Archaeological investigations attest to the presence of human communities on the present territory of the city and around it as far back as the prehistoric age. Later settlements included those of the Cucuteni–Trypillia culture, a late Neolithic archaeological culture.

There is archaeological evidence of human settlements in the area of Iași dating from the 6th to 7th centuries (Curtea Domnească) and 7th to 10th centuries; these settlements contained rectangular houses with semicircular ovens. Also, many of the vessels (9th–11th centuries) found in Iași had a cross, potentially indicating that the inhabitants were Christians.

=== Early development ===
In 1396, Iași is mentioned by the German crusader Johann Schiltberger (a participant in the Battle of Nicopolis). The name of the city is first found in an official document in 1408. This is a grant of certain commercial privileges by the Moldavian Prince Alexander to the Polish merchants of Lvov. However, as buildings older than 1408 still exist, e.g. the Armenian Church believed to be originally built in 1395, it is certain that the city existed before its first surviving written mention.

=== Capital of Moldavia ===
Around 1564, Prince Alexandru Lăpușneanu moved the Moldavian capital from Suceava to Iași. Between 1561 and 1563, a school and a Lutheran church were founded by the Greek adventurer prince, Ioan Iacob Heraclid.

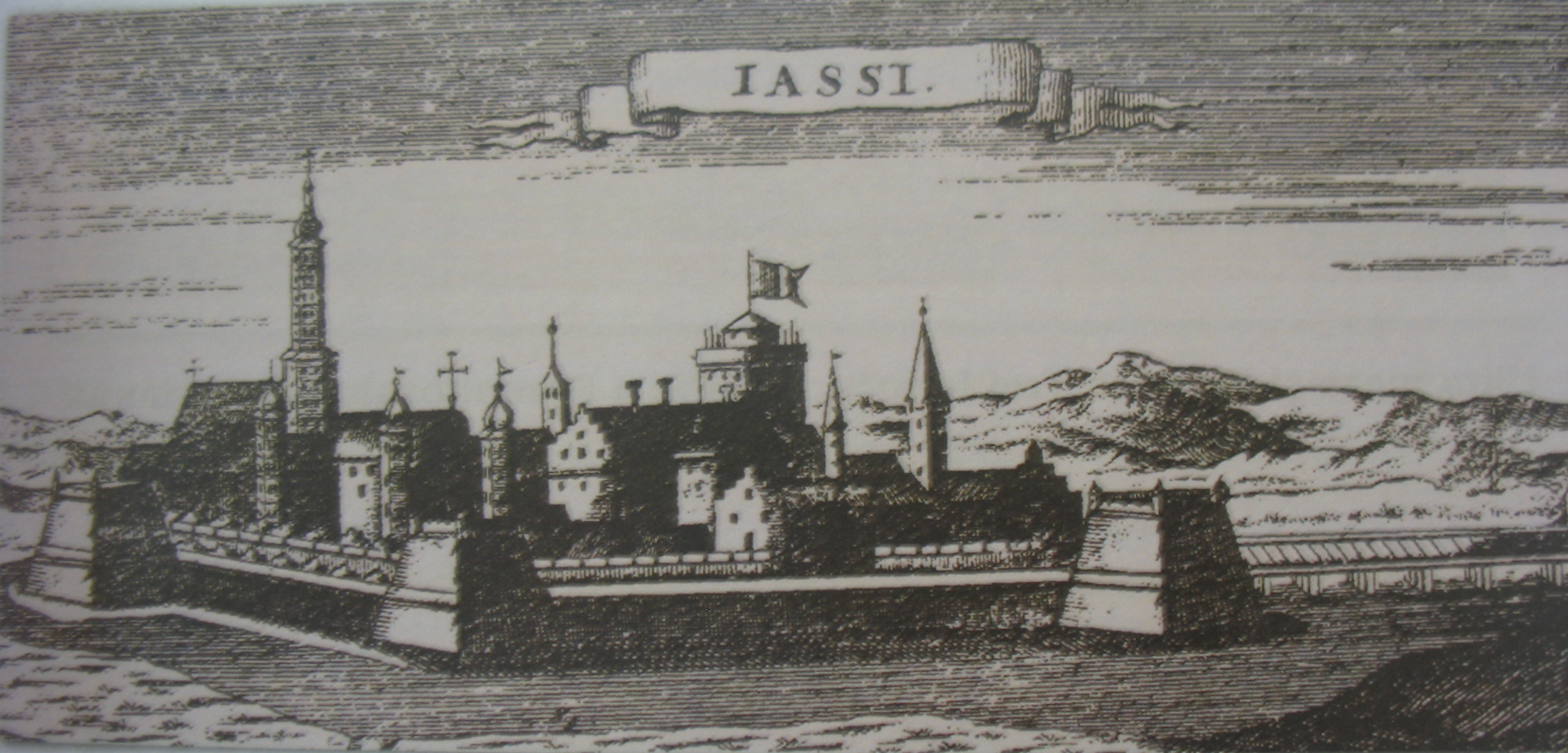
Iași in the 1700s

In 1640, Vasile Lupu established the first school in which the Romanian replaced Greek, and set up a printing press in the Byzantine Trei Ierarhi Monastery (Monastery of the Three Hierarchs; built 1635–39). Between 15 September – 27 October 1642, the city hosted the Synod of Iași (also referred to as the Synod of Jassy). In 1643, the first volume ever printed in Moldavia was published in Iași.

The city was often burned down and looted by the Tatars (in 1513, 1574, 1577, 1593), by the Ottomans in 1538, the Cossacks and Tartars (1650), or the Poles (1620, 1686). In 1734, it was hit by the plague. The city was also affected by famine (1575, 1724, 1739–1740), or large local fires (1725, 1735, 1753, 1766, 1785), propagated by many buildings that were built on wooden structures.

It was through the Treaty of Jassy that the sixth Russo-Turkish War was brought to a close in 1792. A Greek revolutionary manoeuvre and occupation under Alexander Ypsilanti (Αλέξανδρος Υψηλάντης) and the Filiki Eteria (Φιλική Εταιρία) (1821, at the beginning of the Greek War of Independence) led to the storming of the city by the Turks in 1822. In 1844 a severe fire affected much of the city.

=== Mid–19th century to 20th century ===
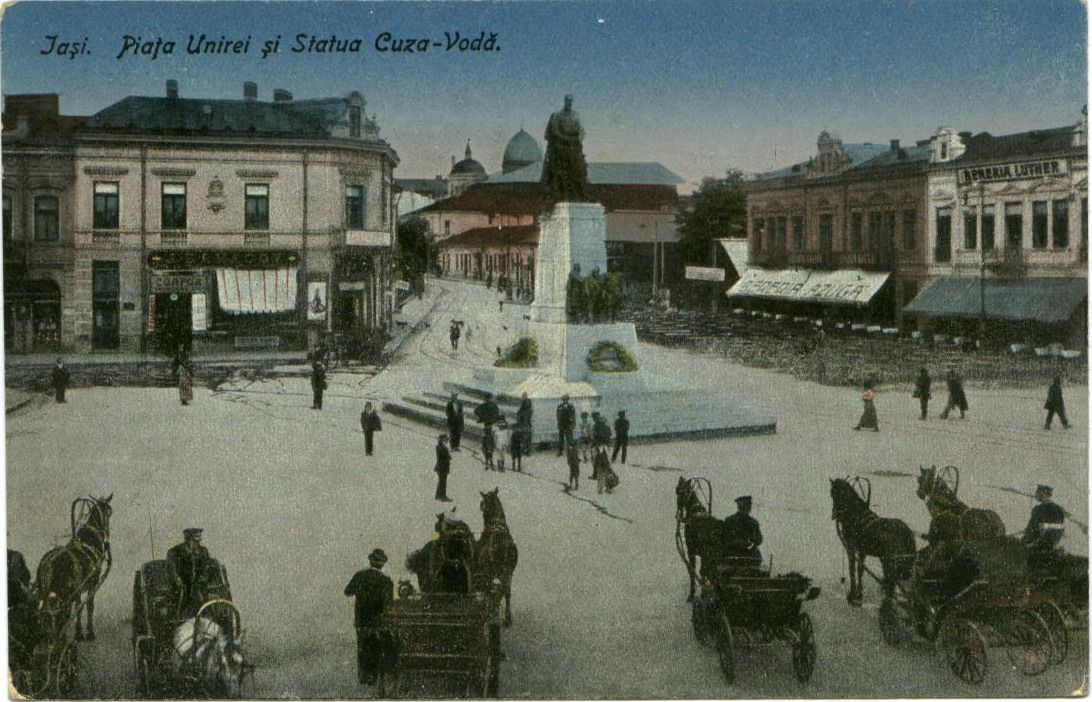
Union Square

Between 1564 and 1859, the city was the capital of Moldavia; then, between 1859 and 1862, both Iași and Bucharest were de facto capitals of the United Principalities of Moldavia and Wallachia. In 1862, when the union of the two principalities was recognised under the name of Romania, the national capital was established in Bucharest. For the loss caused to the city in 1861 by the removal of the seat of government to Bucharest the constituent assembly voted 148,150 lei to be paid in ten annual instalments, but no payment was ever made.

During World War I, Iași was the capital of a much reduced Romania for two years, following the Central Powers' occupation of Bucharest on 6 December 1916. The capital was returned to Bucharest after the defeat of Imperial Germany and its allies in November 1918. In November–December 1918 Iași hosted the Jassy Conference.

=== Jewish community ===
Iași also figures prominently in Jewish history, with the first documented presence of Sephardi Jews from the late 16th century. The oldest tomb inscription in the local cemetery probably dates to 1610. By the mid-19th century, owing to widespread Russian Jewish and Galician Jewish immigration into Moldavia, the city was at least one-third Jewish, growing to 50% Jewish by 1899 according to the Great Geographic Dictionary of Romania cited by JewishGen. The Podu Roș Synagogue was built in Iași, circa 1810, by Avraham Yehoshua Heshel of Apta, but the synagogue became mostly Misnagdic not long thereafter.

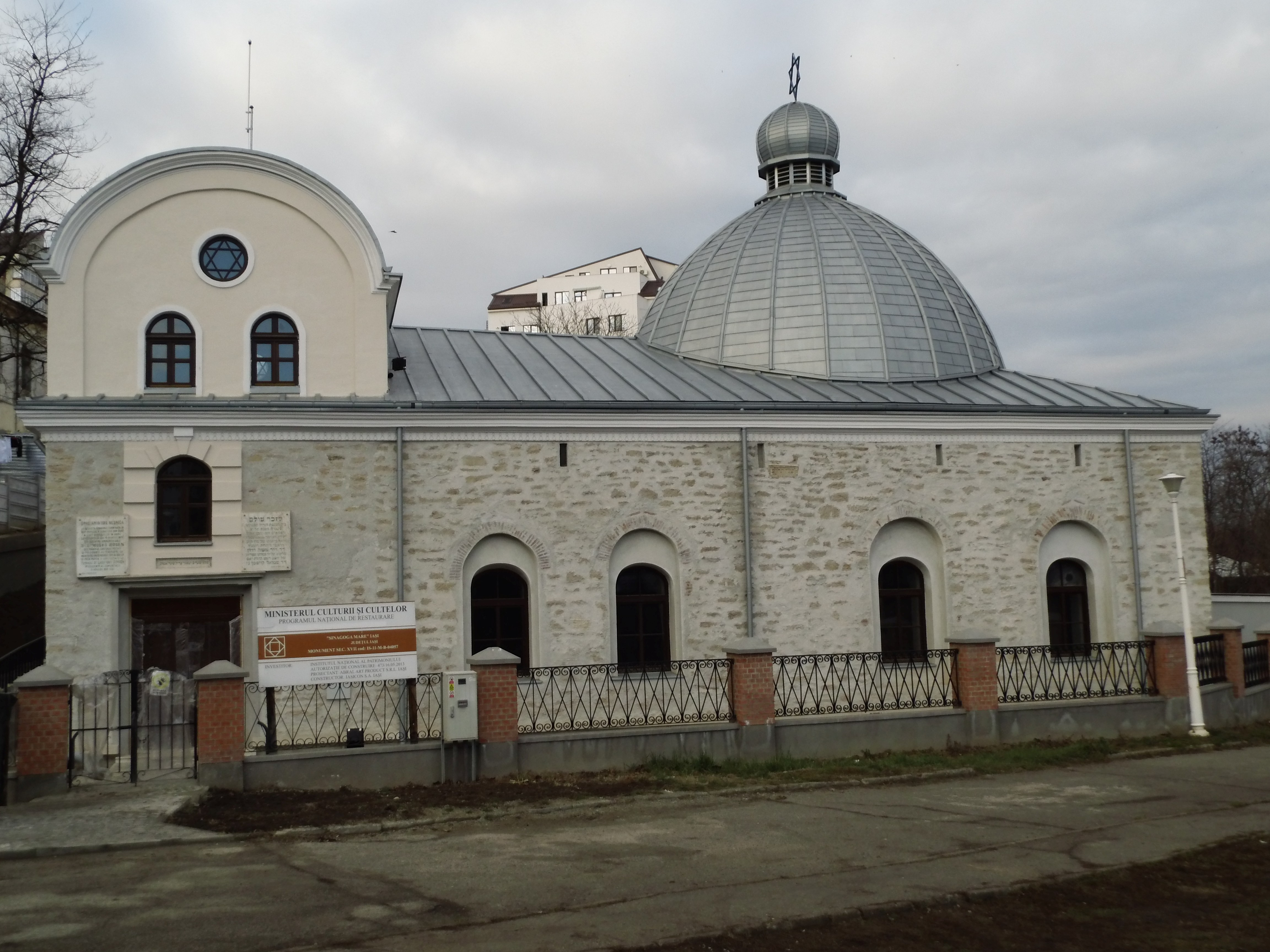
Great Synagogue (1671)

In 1855, Iași was the home of the first-ever Yiddish-language newspaper, Korot Haitim, and, in 1876, the site of what was arguably the first-ever professional Yiddish theatre performance, established by Avraham Goldfaden. The words of HaTikvah, the national anthem of Israel, were written in Iași by Naftali Herz Imber. Jewish musicians in Iași played an important role as preservers of Yiddish folklore, as performers and composers.

The first Zionist Hebrew-language newspaper in Romania, Emek Israel, was published in Iași in 1882. Zionist sports clubs, student associations and discussion groups were established in the city, most of which later merged into the Organizația Sionistă. The Hachshara Farms in Iași were a type of training farms to prepare young people for resettlement in the Palestine region.

According to the 1930 census, with a population of 34,662 (some 34% of the city's population), Jews were the second largest ethnic group in Iași. There were over 127 synagogues. During WWII Romanian government forces under Marshall Ion Antonescu launched the Iași pogrom against the city's Jewish community, which lasted from 28 June to 30 June 1941. According to Romanian authorities, over 13,266 people, or one third of the Jewish population, were massacred and many were deported. It was one of the worst pogroms during World War II. After World War II, in 1947, there were about 38,000 Jews living in Iași. Because of massive emigration to Israel, in 1975 there were about 3,000 Jews living in Iași and four synagogues were active.

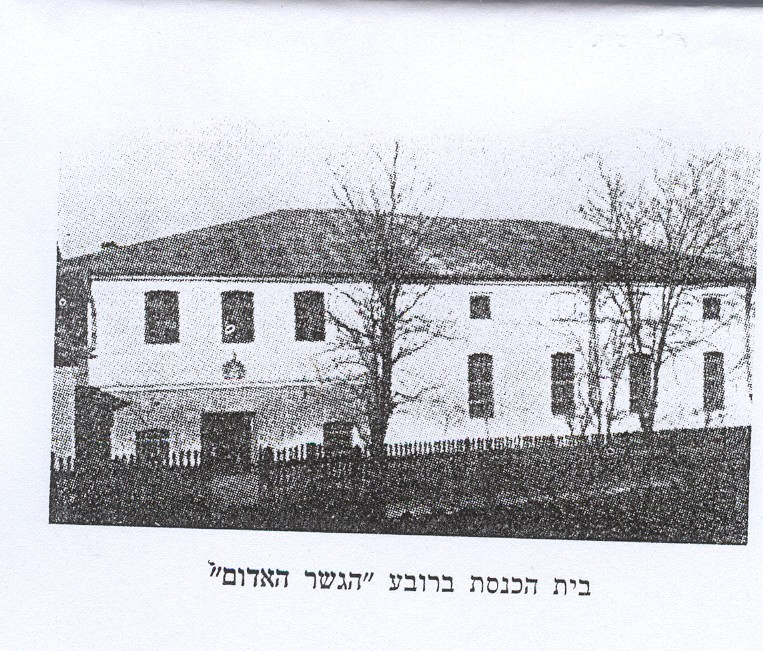
Podu Roș Synagogue (photo circa 1910)

Currently, Iași has a dwindling Jewish population of ca. 300 to 600 members and two working synagogues, one of which, the 1671 Great Synagogue, is the oldest surviving synagogue in Romania and among the oldest synagogues still active in Europe. A 10-year restoration project funded by UNESCO, the Romanian Ministry of Culture and the local authorities of Iași restored it to its former glory, opening in time for Hanukkah on 4 December 2018.

=== Greek community ===
The history of the city and its development is marked by the thriving commercial community of Greeks, as well as their occupation of public positions. The Greek-born monarchs of Moldavia, politicians, teachers, clergy, doctors, philosophers, and writers contributed decisively to the emergence of Iași as an intellectual center.

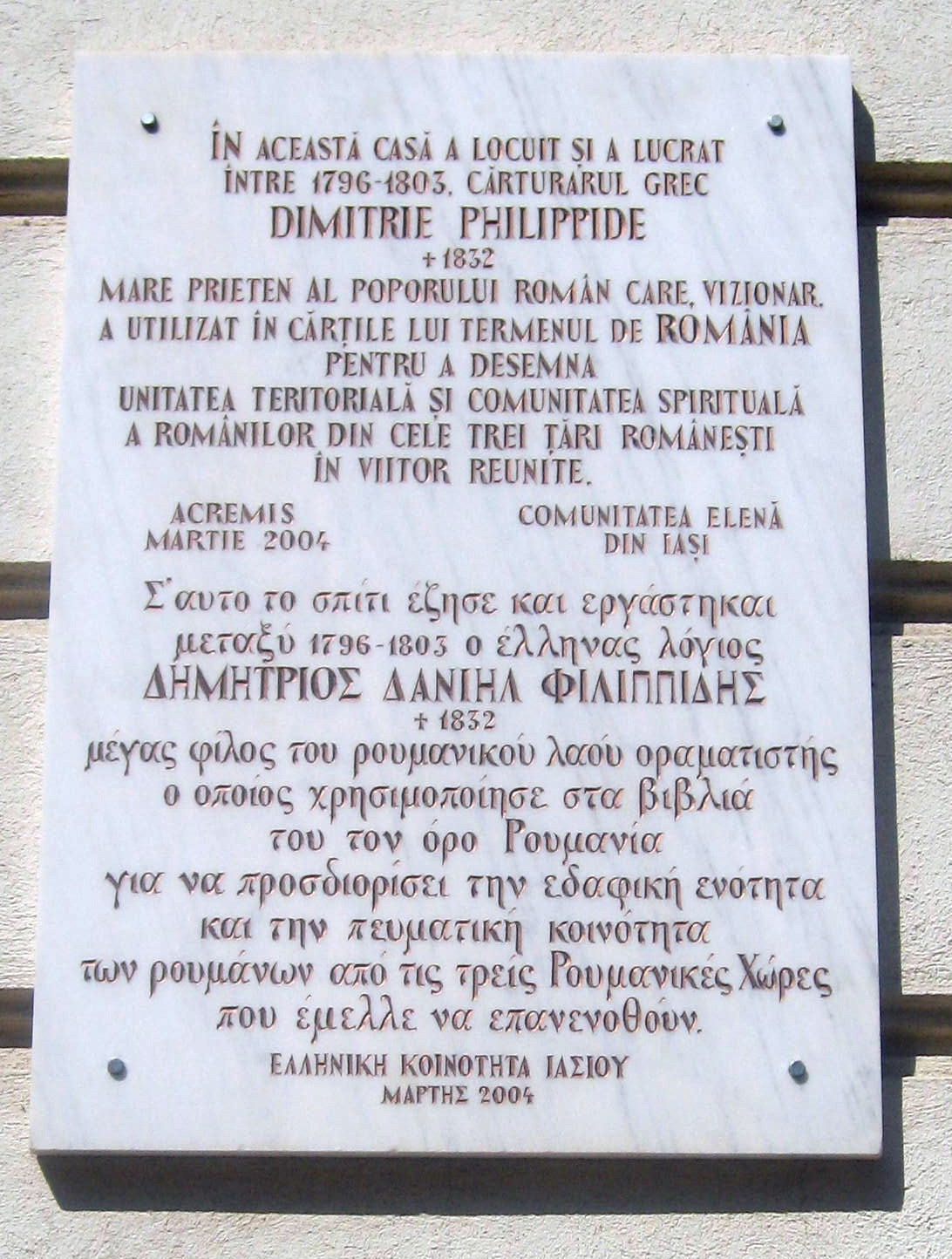
Memorial inscription placed on the facade of the house of Greek scholar Daniel Philippidis in Iași (address: Strada Cuza Vodă 3)

The Greek Hegemonic School (Ελληνική Ηγεμονική Σχολή) was founded in 1709 in Iași and organized in 1710 by prince Nicholas Mavrocordatos. The city already had a Greek printing shop next to the Trei Ierarhi Monastery, since the time of the ruler Vasile Lupu. From 1774 the school was transformed into an academy with a philological, theological, mathematical and physical department, an academy that became known for its great Greek professors. A Greek Mechanical School also operated in Iași at the same time. From 1728, the Greek language began to be taught as a subject in the existing school, and from 1776 it was established as the language for all subjects at the school.

Iași was an important center of the revolutionary organization Filiki Eteria and was chosen as the core of the formation of the Greek forces. Here Georgios Lassanis from Kozani gathered and recruited warriors on the orders of Alexander Ypsilantis. On 24 February 1821, Alexander Ypsilantis issued a proclamation at Trei Ierarhi Monastery and at the head of approximately 200 infantry and cavalry, declared the Greek Revolution. The struggle for the liberation of Greece began in Iași.

The modern "Greek Community of Iași" was founded in 1990. The community has approximately 400 official members but the Greeks in Iași are much more numerous according to its president Marika Pieptou. At the end of May 2008, the 7th Greek Language "Olympiad" was organized in the city of Iași, in the halls of the "Ion Simionescu" General School. 66 students of Greek origin and philhellenes, of all ages and language levels, took part in the competition. The organizers were honored with the presence of the Minister of Education of Romania, Anghel Stanciu, the Chairman of the Education Committee of the Romanian Parliament, as well as representatives of the local authorities and the presidency of the Hellenic Union of Romania. Also, at the Alexandru Ioan Cuza University there is a department (lectorate) of Greek language.

=== World War II ===
During the war, while the full scale of the Holocaust remained generally unknown to the Allied Powers, the Iași pogrom, launched by the Romanian dictator, Ion Antonescu, stood as one of the well-known examples of brutality toward the Jews. The pogrom lasted from 29 June to 6 July 1941, and over 13,266 people, or one third of the Jewish population, were massacred in the pogrom itself or in its aftermath, and many were deported. Particularly brutal was the massacre of Jews who were forced on sealed trains in the brutal summer heat. Over half of the occupants perished in these trains, which were aimlessly driven throughout the countryside with no particular destination.

In May 1944, the Iași area became the scene of ferocious fighting between Romanian-German forces and the advancing Soviet Red Army and the city was partially destroyed. The German Panzergrenadier Division Großdeutschland won a defensive victory at the Battle of Târgu Frumos, near Iași, which was the object of several NATO studies during the Cold War. By 20 August, Iași had been taken by Soviet forces.

Iași suffered heavy damage due to Soviet (June–July 1941, June 1944) and American (June 1944) airstrikes, respectively. The bombing of Soviet aviation and artillery on 20 August 1944, resulted in more than 5,000 civilian deaths and the destruction of two-thirds of the city.

=== Post-World War II era ===
Iași experienced a major wave of industrialisation, in 1955–1989. During this period of time, it received numerous migrants from rural regions, and the urban area expanded. In the Communist era, Iași saw a growth of 235% in population and 69% in area. The local systematisation plans of the old city started in 1960 and continued in the 1970s and 1980s as part of the larger national systematisation programme; however, the urban planning was sometimes arbitrary and followed by dysfunctions. By 1989, Iași had become highly industrialised, with 108,000 employees (representing 47% of the total workforce) active in 46 large state-owned enterprises, in various industries: machine building and heavy equipment, chemical, textile, pharmaceutical, metallurgical, electronics, food, energy, building materials, furniture.

After the end of the Communist regime and the transition to a free market economy, the private sector has grown steadily, while much of the old industry (such as the industrial sector) gradually decayed.

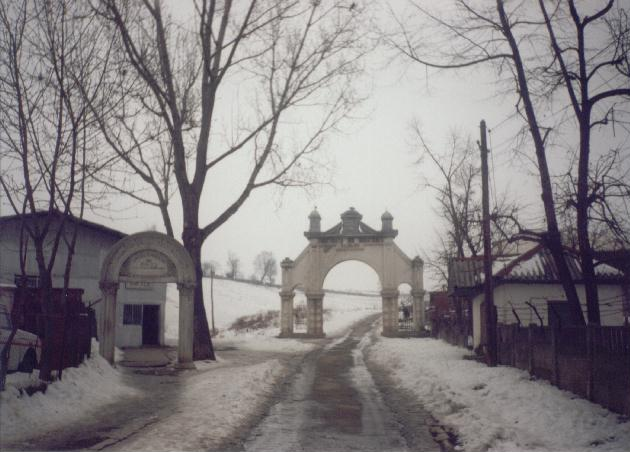
Păcurari Cemetery Gate (the old Jewish cemetery)

== Geography ==
=== Topography ===
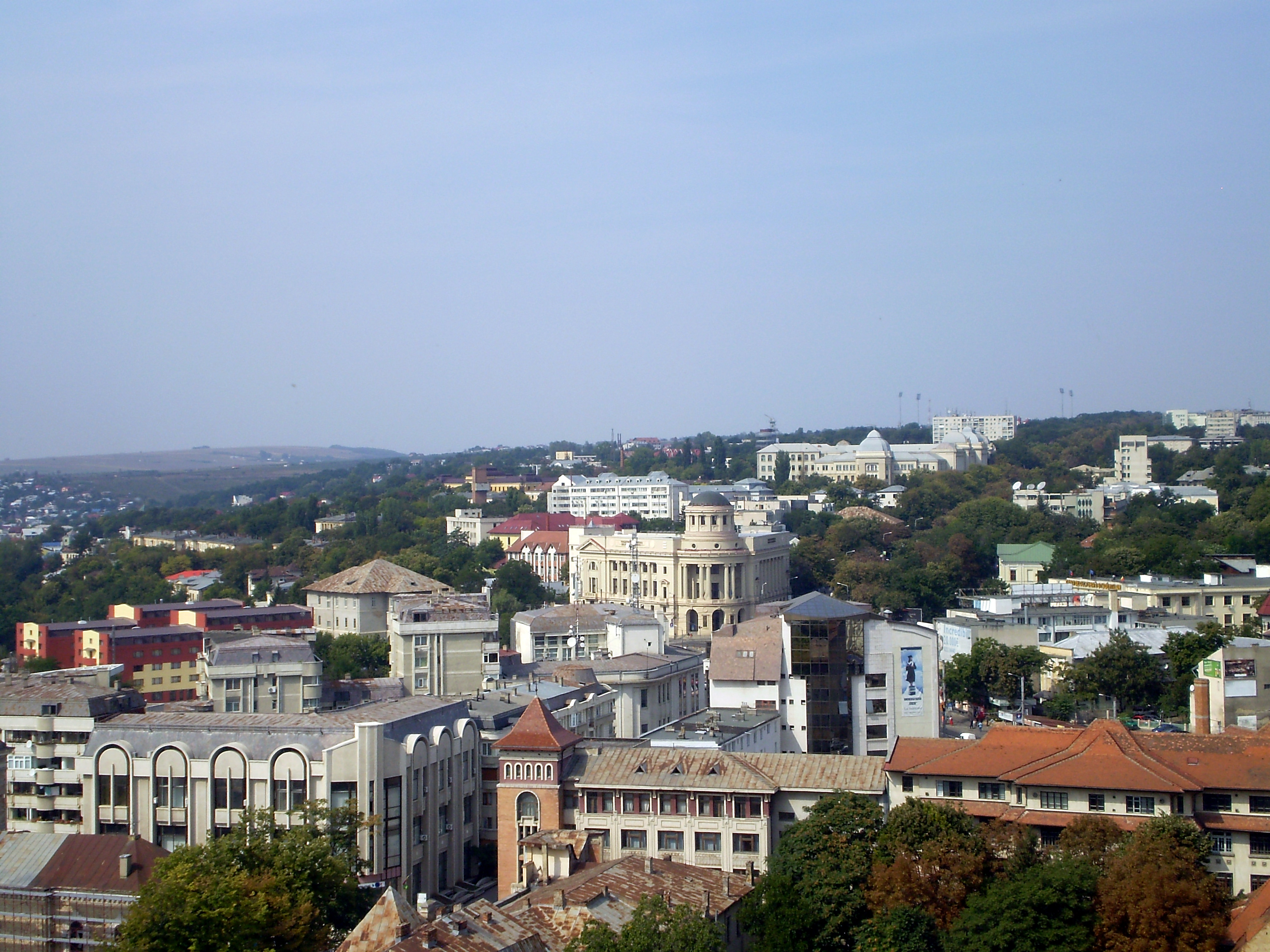
Panoramic view of the Copou Hill

Located in northeastern Romania, at the contact between the Jijia Plain and the Bârlad Plateau, Iași used to be the crossroads place of the historic trade routes that passed through Moldavia coming from the Kingdom of Poland, Habsburg monarchy, Tsardom of Russia, and Constantinople.

The city lies on the Bahlui River valley, a tributary of the Jijia River (tributary of the Prut River). The surrounding country is one of uplands and woods, featuring monasteries and parks. Iași itself stands amid vineyards and gardens, partly on hills, partly in the in-between valley.

The central part of the city is located on the 25 m (82 ft) fluvial terrace of the Bahlui River (the so-called Palat Terrace). From this nucleus, the city evolved after the medieval times toward south and north on the Bahlui River floodplain and on the adjacent hills. The southern part of the city lies on the Iași Ridge (Romanian: Coasta Iașilor) (the northernmost hill of the Bârlad Plateau). Considering the present day extension of the administrative boundaries, the city territory has an altitudinal extension of 320 m (1,050 ft), between the 34.5 m a.s.l. (113.19 ft) in the Bahlui River floodplain, at the Holboca bridge, and 354.77 m a.s.l. (1,163.94 ft), at the edge of the Repedea Hill.

It is a common belief that Iași is built on seven hills (Romanian: coline): Breazu, Bucium, Cetățuia, Copou, Galata, Repedea and Șorogari, thus triggering comparisons with Rome.

=== Climate ===
Under the Köppen climate classification, Iaşi falls within either a humid continental climate (Dfa, near Dfb) if the 0 °C (32 °F) isotherm is used, or a humid temperate climate (Cfa) bordering on an oceanic climate (Cfb) if the −3 °C (27 °F) isotherm is used. Iași experiences four distinct seasons. Summers are warm with temperatures sometimes exceeding 35 °C (95 °F) while winters are cold and windy with moderate snowfall and temperatures at night sometimes dropping below −15 °C (5 °F).

Climate data for Iași, Romania (Iași International Airport) (1991–2020, extremes 1896-present)
| Month | Jan | Feb | Mar | Apr | May | Jun | Jul | Aug | Sep | Oct | Nov | Dec | Year |
|---|---|---|---|---|---|---|---|---|---|---|---|---|---|
| Record high °C (°F) | 19.4 (66.9) | 22.5 (72.5) | 27.9 (82.2) | 31.8 (89.2) | 36.4 (97.5) | 38.0 (100.4) | 40.1 (104.2) | 41.3 (106.3) | 38.0 (100.4) | 33.9 (93.0) | 29.0 (84.2) | 19.5 (67.1) | 41.3 (106.3) |
| Mean daily maximum °C (°F) | 1.3 (34.3) | 3.9 (39.0) | 10.2 (50.4) | 17.5 (63.5) | 23.3 (73.9) | 27.0 (80.6) | 29.0 (84.2) | 28.8 (83.8) | 23.1 (73.6) | 16.3 (61.3) | 8.8 (47.8) | 2.8 (37.0) | 16.0 (60.8) |
| Daily mean °C (°F) | −2.1 (28.2) | −0.3 (31.5) | 4.5 (40.1) | 11.1 (52.0) | 16.8 (62.2) | 20.7 (69.3) | 22.4 (72.3) | 21.7 (71.1) | 16.3 (61.3) | 10.4 (50.7) | 4.8 (40.6) | −0.5 (31.1) | 10.5 (50.9) |
| Mean daily minimum °C (°F) | −5.1 (22.8) | −3.6 (25.5) | 0.2 (32.4) | 5.6 (42.1) | 10.7 (51.3) | 14.7 (58.5) | 16.3 (61.3) | 15.6 (60.1) | 11.0 (51.8) | 6.1 (43.0) | 1.7 (35.1) | −3.3 (26.1) | 5.8 (42.4) |
| Record low °C (°F) | −30.6 (−23.1) | −36.3 (−33.3) | −22.7 (−8.9) | −9.4 (15.1) | −3.0 (26.6) | 3.5 (38.3) | 6.3 (43.3) | −0.5 (31.1) | −6.7 (19.9) | −21.1 (−6.0) | −27.2 (−17.0) | −29.5 (−21.1) | −36.3 (−33.3) |
| Average precipitation mm (inches) | 27.7 (1.09) | 25.8 (1.02) | 33.5 (1.32) | 43.5 (1.71) | 59.9 (2.36) | 78.0 (3.07) | 70.8 (2.79) | 49.4 (1.94) | 49.2 (1.94) | 45.4 (1.79) | 33.0 (1.30) | 31.8 (1.25) | 548.0 (21.57) |
| Average snowfall cm (inches) | 11.3 (4.4) | 14.3 (5.6) | 11.9 (4.7) | 6.9 (2.7) | 0.0 (0.0) | 0.0 (0.0) | 0.0 (0.0) | 0.0 (0.0) | 0.0 (0.0) | 0.7 (0.3) | 10.4 (4.1) | 6.3 (2.5) | 61.8 (24.3) |
| Average precipitation days (≥ 1.0 mm) | 5.9 | 4.9 | 6.2 | 6.5 | 8.4 | 8.4 | 7.5 | 5.4 | 5.5 | 5.4 | 5.0 | 6.0 | 75.1 |
| Average relative humidity (%) | 82 | 80 | 71 | 62 | 61 | 62 | 60 | 63 | 66 | 73 | 79 | 83 | 70 |
| Average dew point °C (°F) | −5.6 (21.9) | −4.7 (23.5) | −0.1 (31.8) | 4.7 (40.5) | 9.6 (49.3) | 13.2 (55.8) | 14.6 (58.3) | 13.9 (57.0) | 10.6 (51.1) | 6.1 (43.0) | 2.0 (35.6) | −2.0 (28.4) | 5.2 (41.4) |
| Mean monthly sunshine hours | 71.3 | 95.0 | 147.6 | 196.1 | 254.0 | 265.5 | 291.2 | 276.0 | 200.5 | 146.9 | 77.9 | 61.5 | 2,083.5 |
Source 1: NOAA (snowfall and dew point 1961–1990), Meteomanz (extremes since 2021)
Source 2: Romanian National Statistic Institute (extremes 1901–2000), Deutscher Wetterdienst (extremes, 1896–2015 and humidity, 1896–1960)

== Cityscape ==
=== Architecture ===
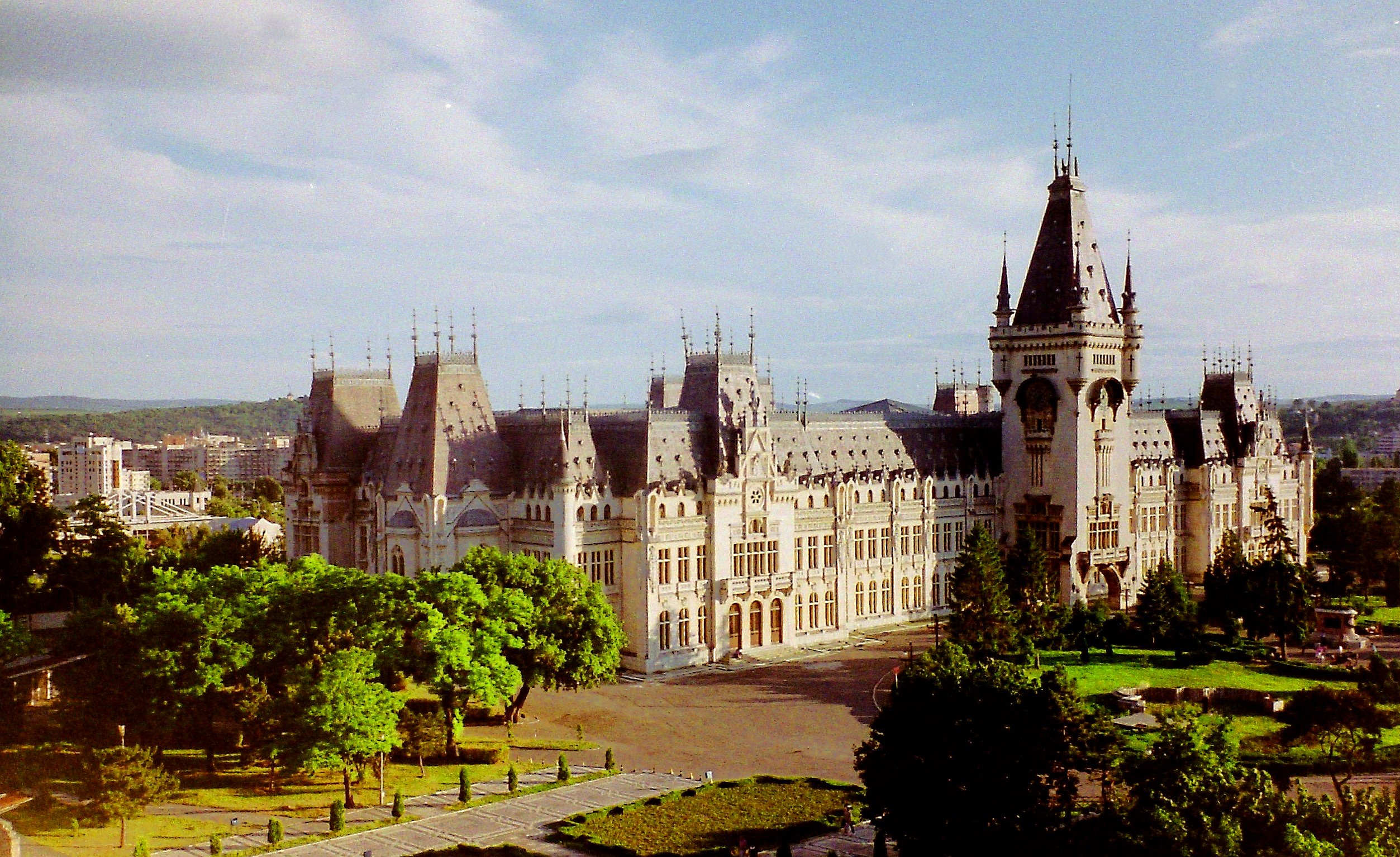
The neo-Gothic Palace of Culture, built on the old ruins of the mediaeval Princely Court is a reconstruction of the former neoclassical Princely Palace of Moldavia

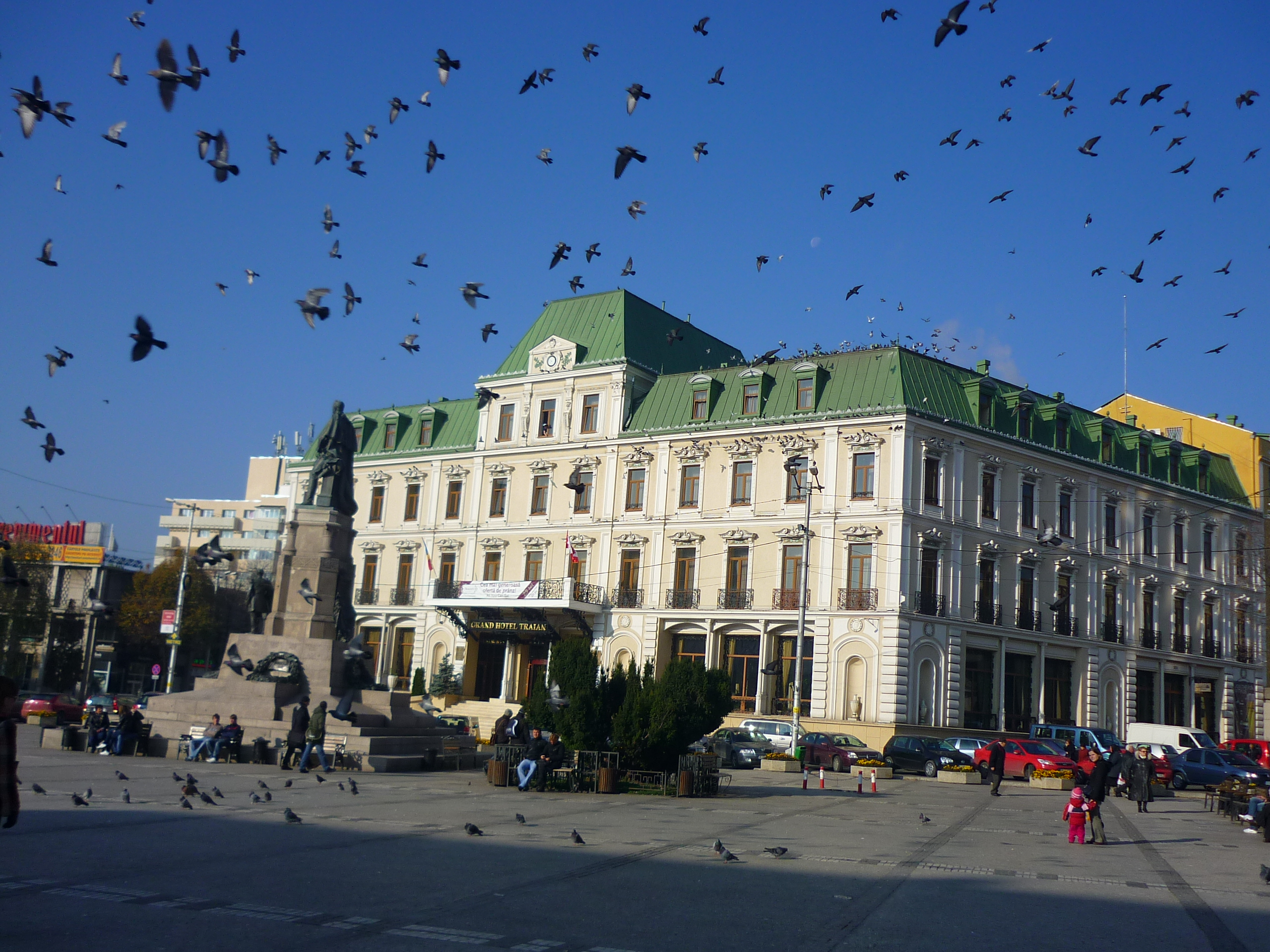
Grand Hotel Traian (Union Square), designed and built by Gustave Eiffel

Iași features historical monuments, 500-year-old churches and monasteries, contemporary architecture, many of them listed on the National Register of Historic Monuments. Notable architecture includes the Trei Ierarhi Monastery, part of the tentative list of UNESCO World Heritage Site, or the neo-Gothic Palace of Culture, built on the old ruins of the mediaeval Princely Court of Moldavia.

During World War II and the Communist era many historical buildings in the old city centre (around Union Square area) were destroyed or demolished, and replaced by International style buildings and also a new mainly Mid-Century modern style Civic Centre was built around the Old Market Square (The Central Hall).

The mid-1990s to early-2000s brought the first non-industrial glass curtain walled buildings (Romtelecom, Hotel Europa), while in 2012, in close proximity to the Palace of Culture, the Palas shopping mall and office complex was inaugurated.

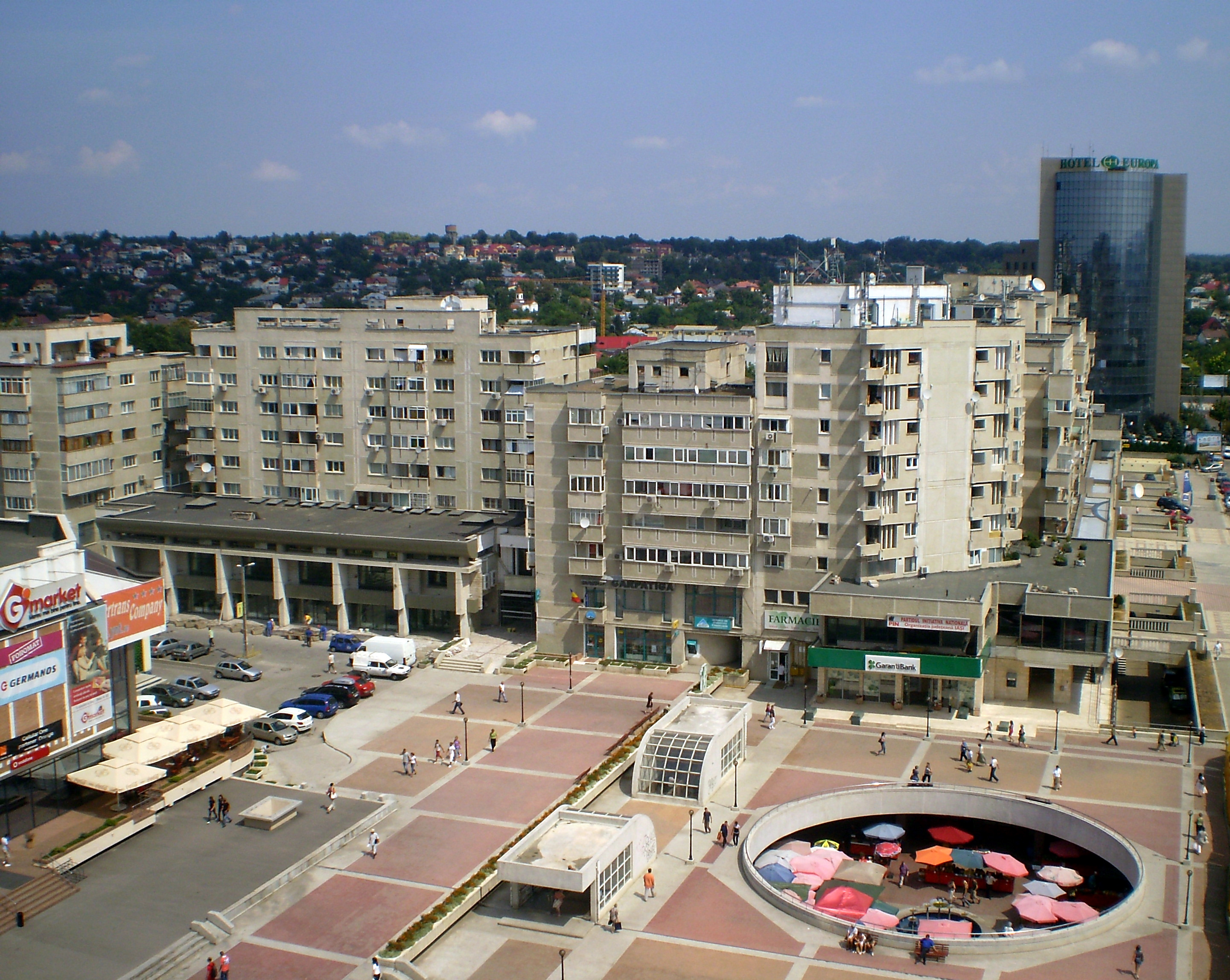
Communist era Central Hall Square

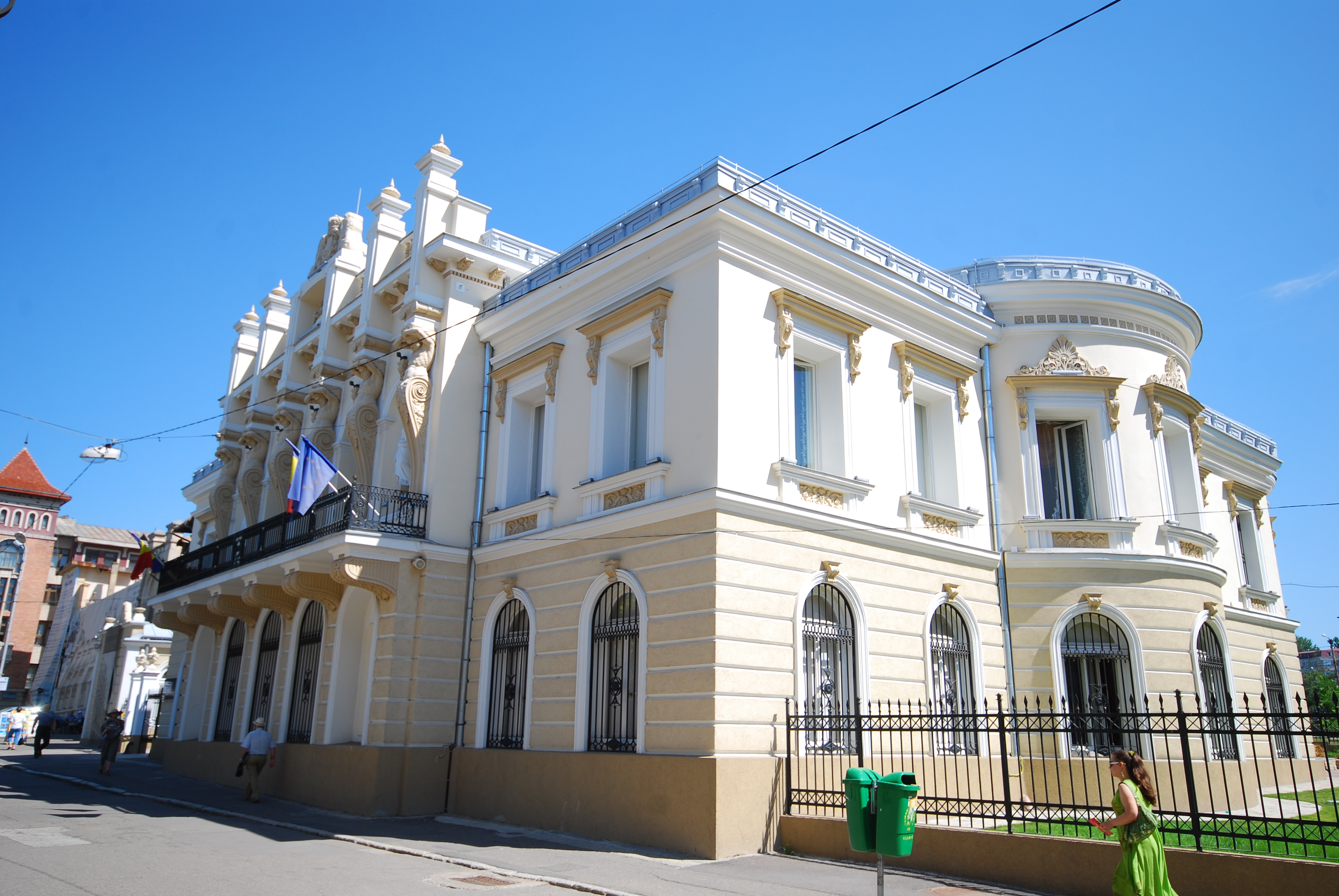
Cuza Palace, now the Union Museum

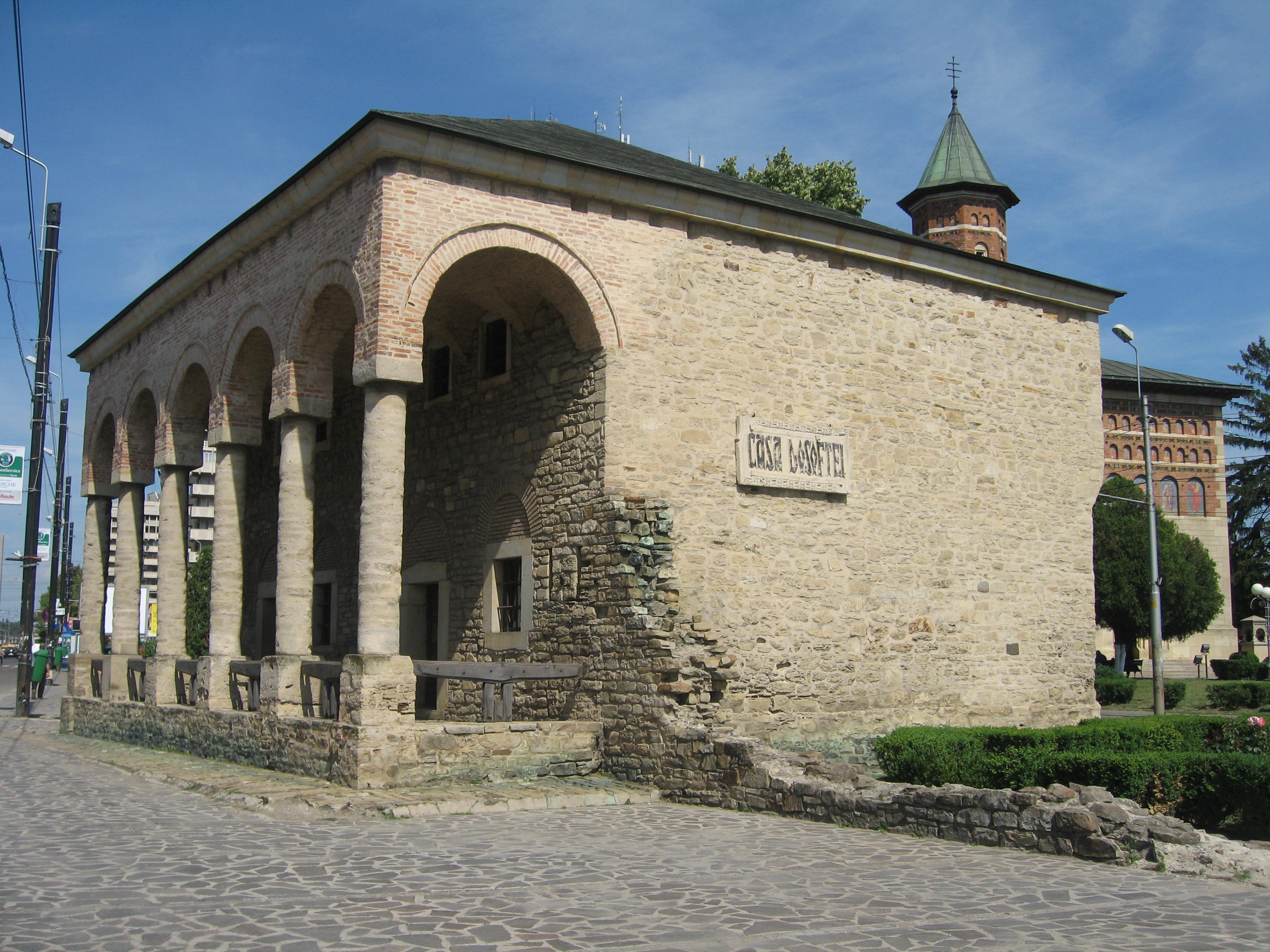
Dosoftei House

Other significant buildings include:

- Alexandru Ioan Cuza University main building (1897), a mixture of the Neoclassical and Baroque styles, houses the famous Hall of the Lost Footsteps where one can admire the works of the painter Sabin Bălașa;
- "Vasile Alecsandri" National Theatre, built between 1894 and 1896 in Neoclassic style with Baroque and Rococo inspired painted and sculpted ornaments;
- Dosoftei House, a building from the second half of the 17th century in which in 1679, the metropolitan bishop Dosoftei settled the second typography in Moldavia. With three façades, arched and right-angled windows, the edifice was restored between 1966 and 1969. It houses the department of old literature of the Romanian Literature Museum;
- Roznovanu Palace (The City Hall), second half of the 18th century, rebuilt between 1830 and 1833, it hosted the Romanian government during World War I;
- Union Museum, 1806, Empire style, the palace served as the royal residence of Prince Alexandru Ioan Cuza between 1859 and 1862 and in 1917–1918, during World War I, as the royal residence of king Ferdinand;
- Pogor House, 1850, a meeting place for the city intellectuals, the headquarters of Literary Society Junimea (1863) and of the Convorbiri Literare (Literary Interlocutions) magazine (1867), houses the Romanian Literature Museum;
- Luceafărul Theatre, 1987, a unique modern building in Romania;
- Central University Library, 1934, incorporates Greek Revival elements;
- Great Railway Station, 1870, inspired by the Venetian Doge's Palace.

=== Religious buildings ===
Iași is the seat of the Romanian Orthodox Metropolitan of Moldavia and Bukovina, and of the Roman Catholic Bishop of Iași. The city and the surrounding area house more than 10 monasteries and 100 historical churches. Among the oldest is Princely Saint Nicholas (1491), dating from the reign of Stephen the Great, and the Metropolitan Cathedral is the largest of its kind in Romania. The Trei Ierarhi Monastery, a unique monument, considered to be an architectural masterpiece, was erected in 1635–1639 by Vasile Lupu, and adorned with gilded carvings on its outer walls and twin towers.

- Metropolitan Cathedral (1839/1886), the largest Orthodox church in Romania, a late Renaissance style, with Baroque elements and Gheorghe Tattarescu paintings, it contains the relics of Saint Paracheva (sometimes known colloquially in English as Saint Friday);
- Golia Monastery, 1564, rebuilt in 1650 in late-Renaissance style with Byzantine frescoes and intricately carved doorways, is a monumental construction, a monastery in the middle of the city, surrounded by tall walls, with corner turrets, and a 30 m (98.43 ft) height bell tower;
- Old Catholic Cathedral, 1782, in Baroque style, and New Catholic Cathedral, 2005;
- Armenian Church, built in 1395, testifies the existence of an important Armenian community in these parts of Romania;
- Great Synagogue, in late Baroque style, built in 1657–1671, is the oldest surviving synagogue in Romania and one of the oldest in Europe.

Other examples of historic churches and monasteries (some of them surrounded by defence walls and towers) include: Socola (1562), Galata (1582), Saint Sava (1583), Hlincea (1587), Aroneanu (1594), Bârnova (1603), Barnovschi (1627), Golia (1650), Cetățuia (1668), Frumoasa (1726), Saint Spiridon (1747), Old Metropolitan Cathedral (1761), Bărboi (1843 with 18th-century bell tower), Bucium (1853).

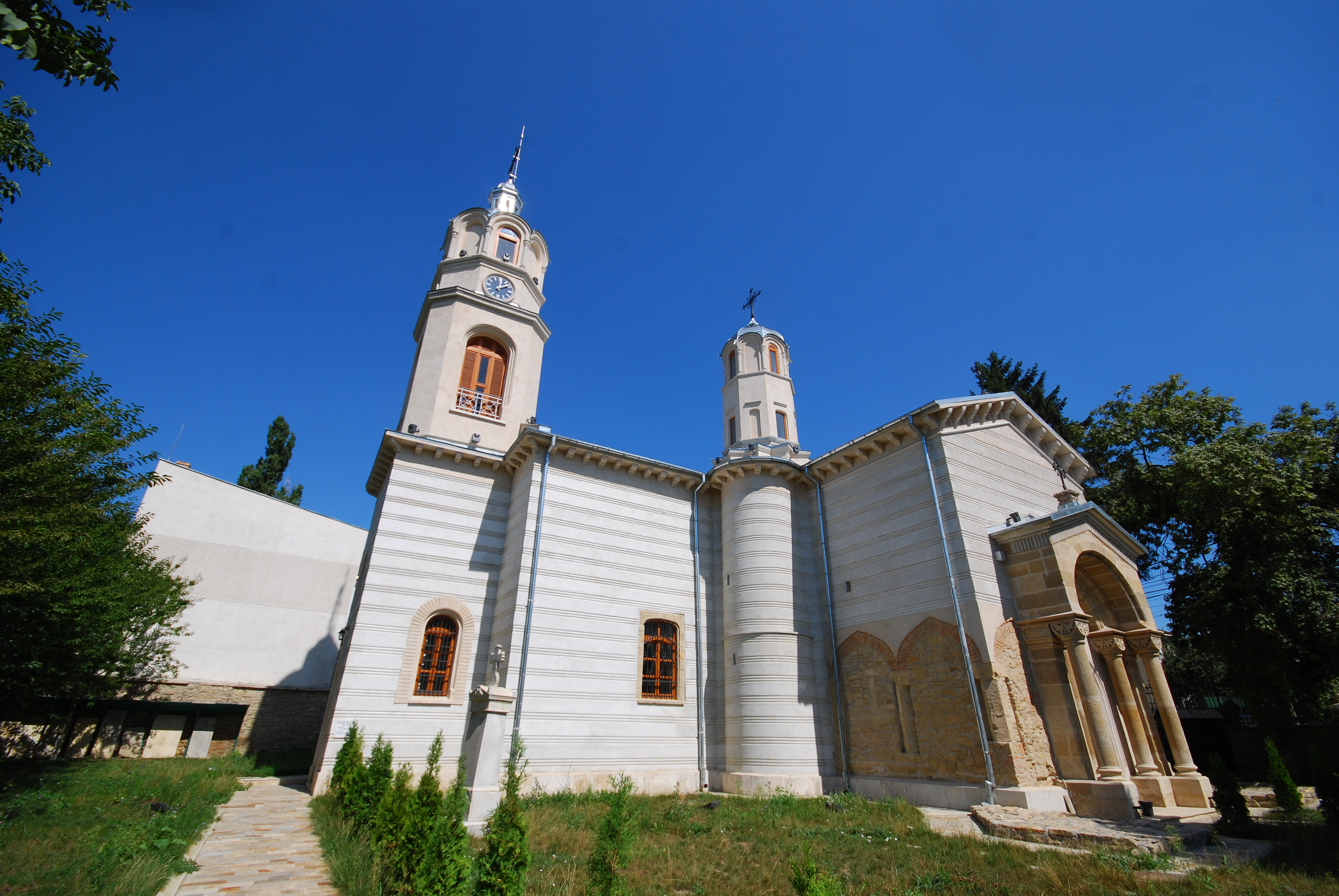
Armenian Church

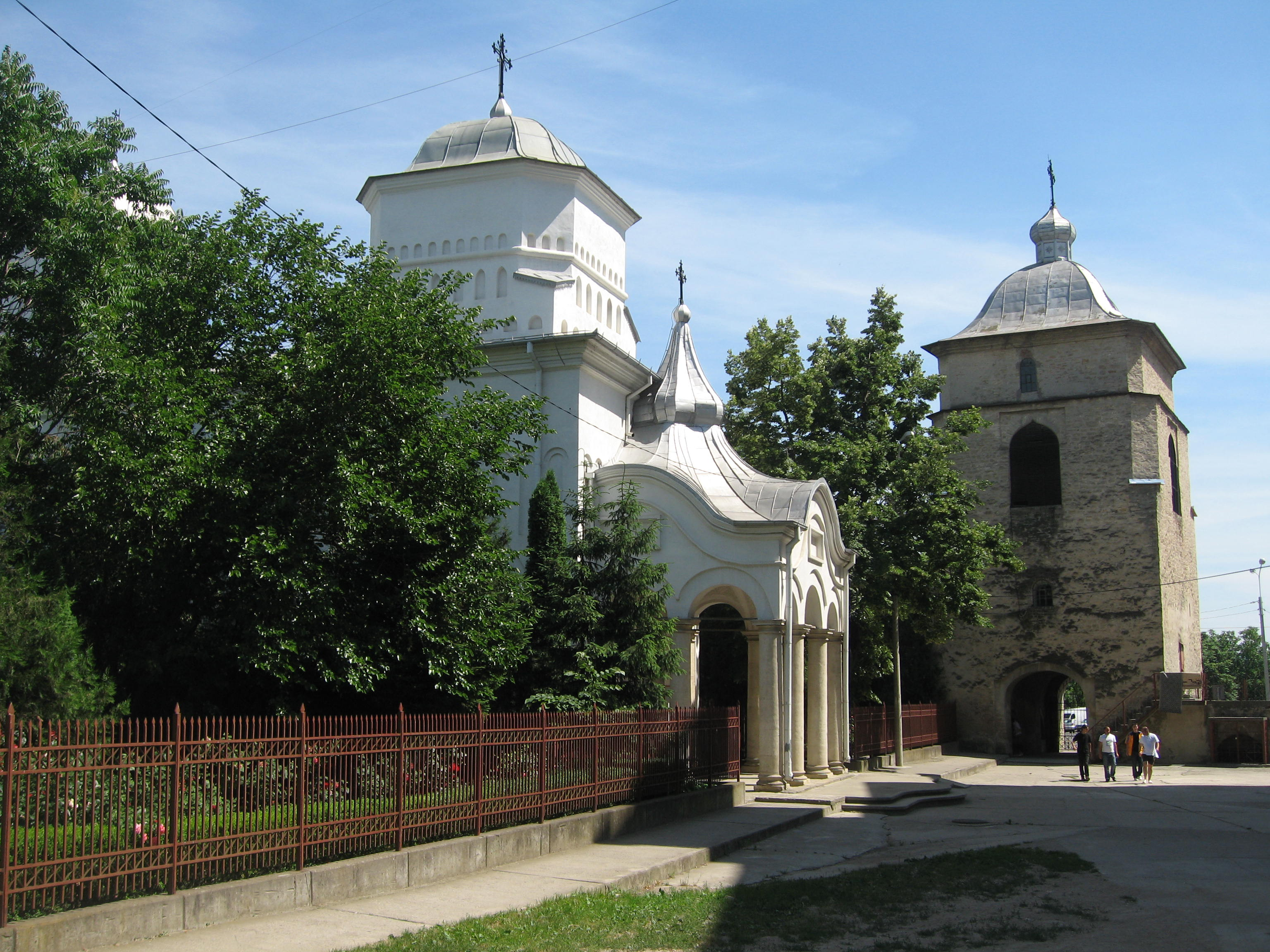
Barnovschi Church

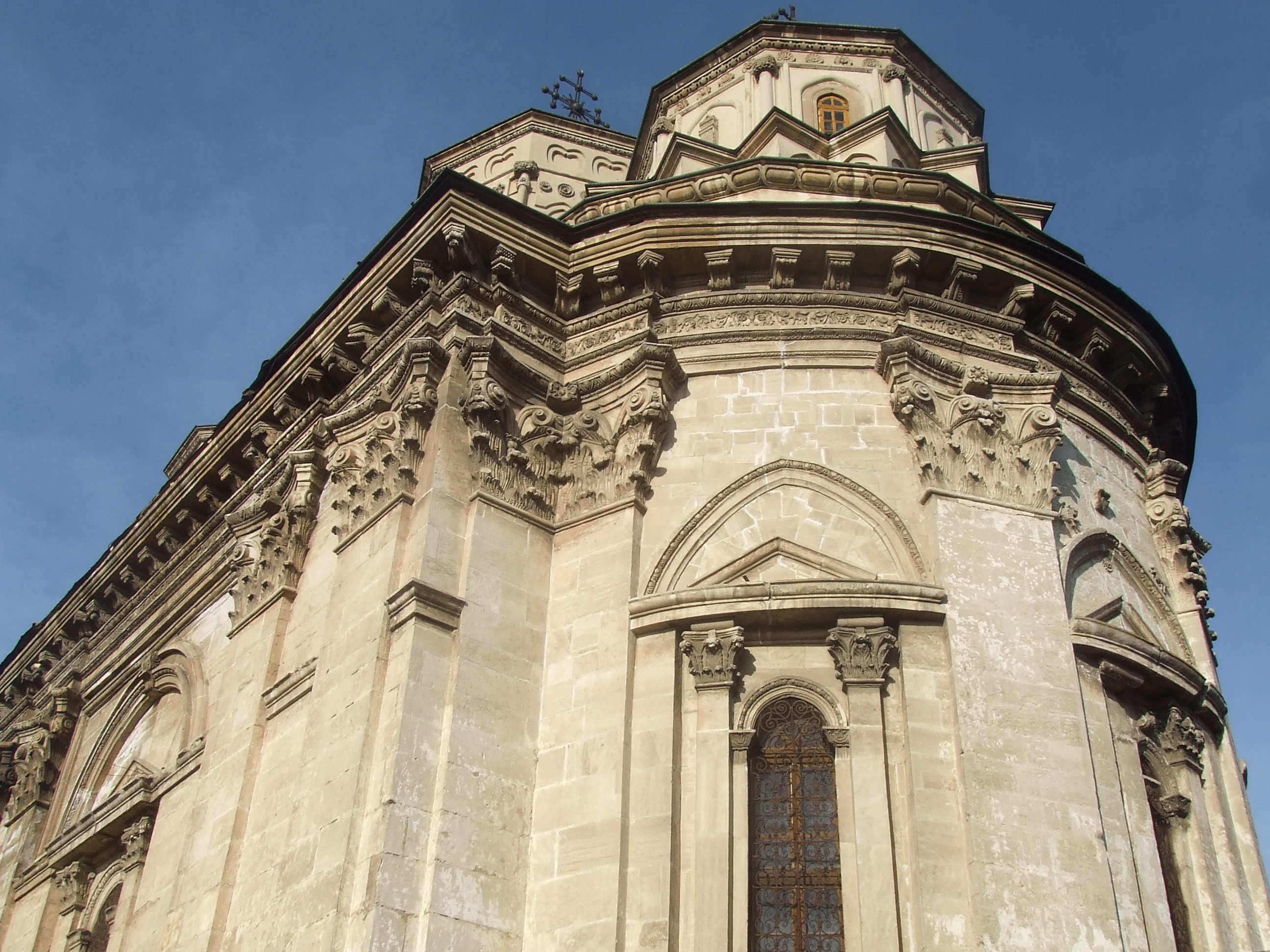
Golia Church architectural elements

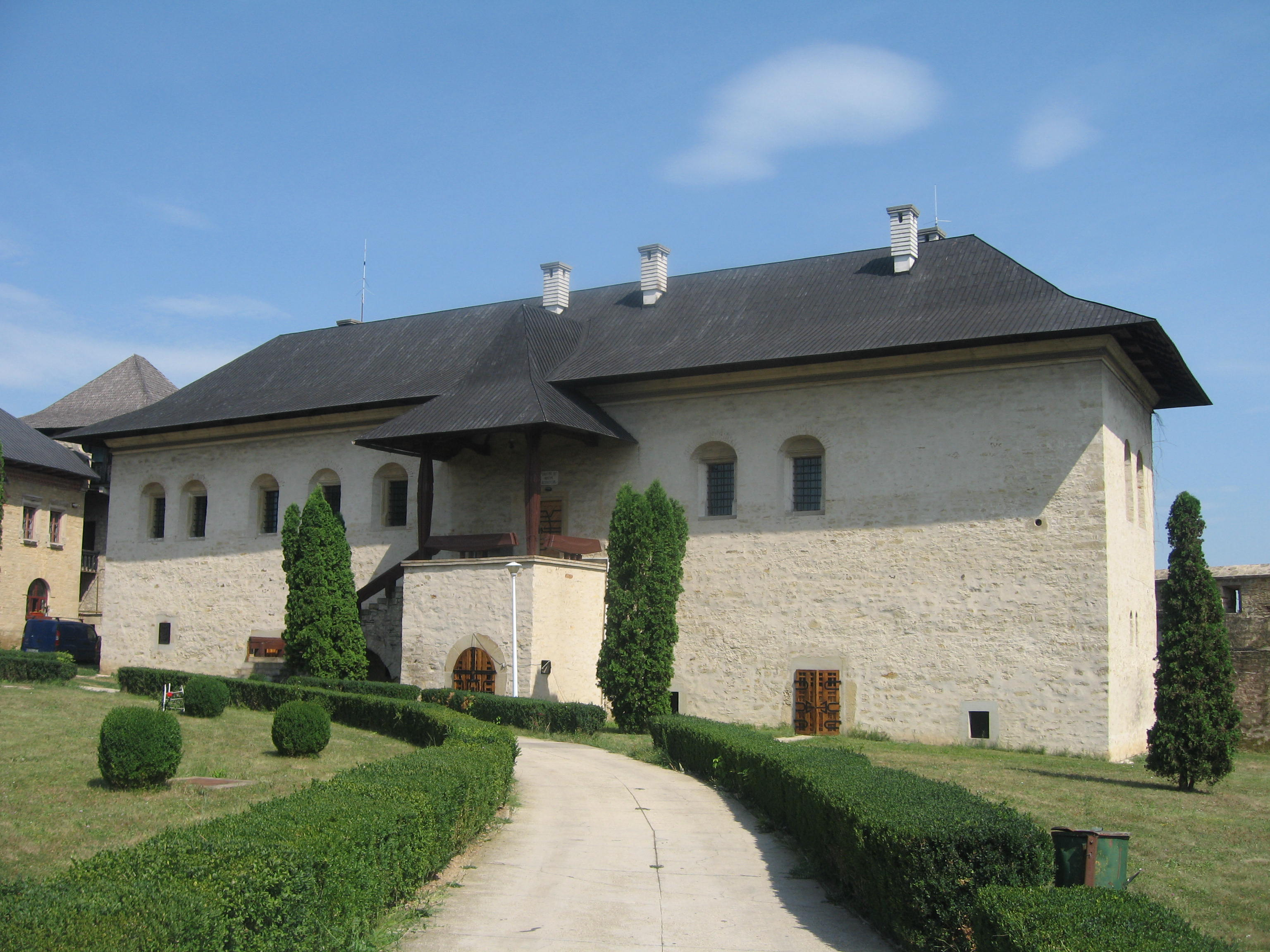
Moldavian princely palace at Cetățuia Monastery

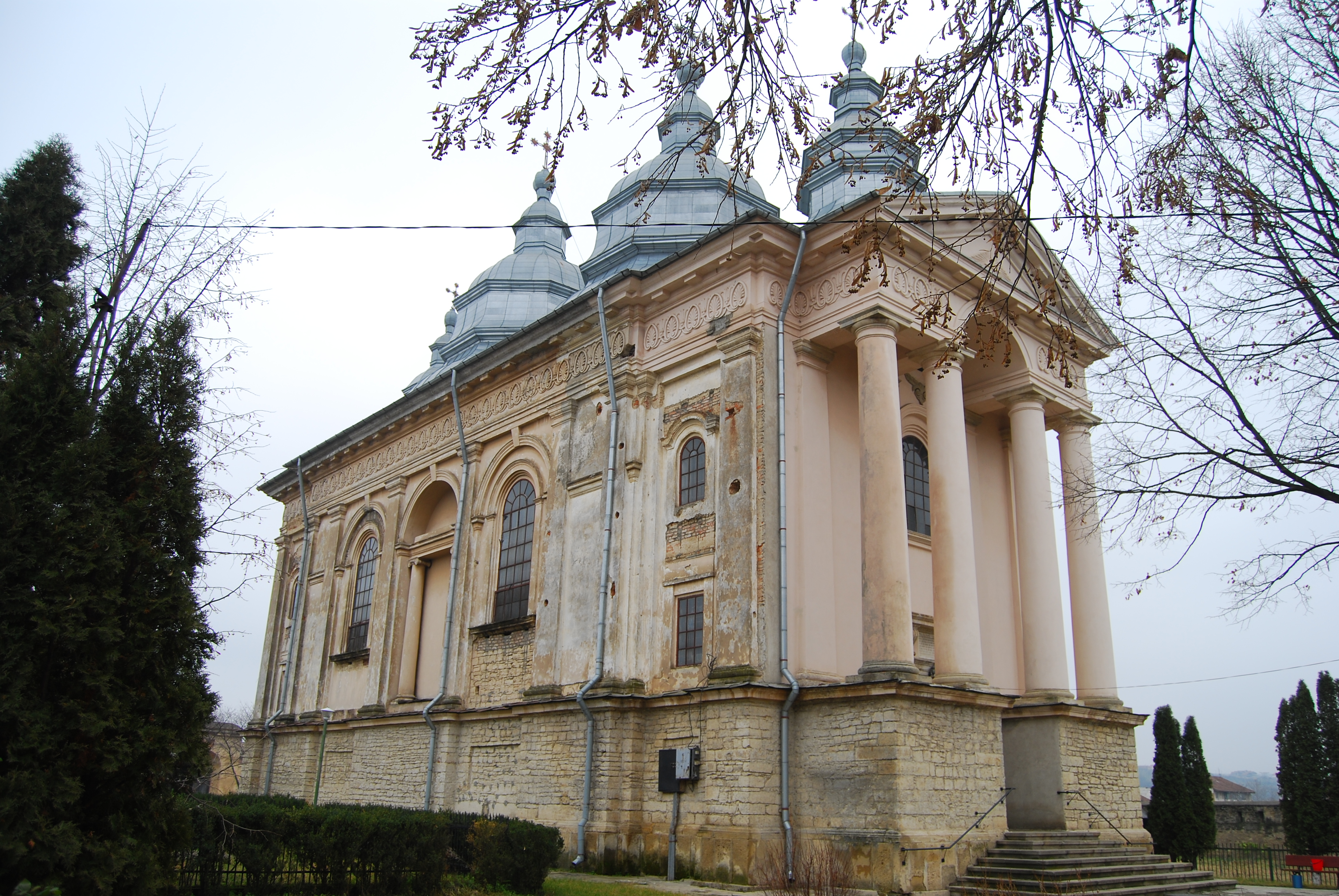
Frumoasa Monastery

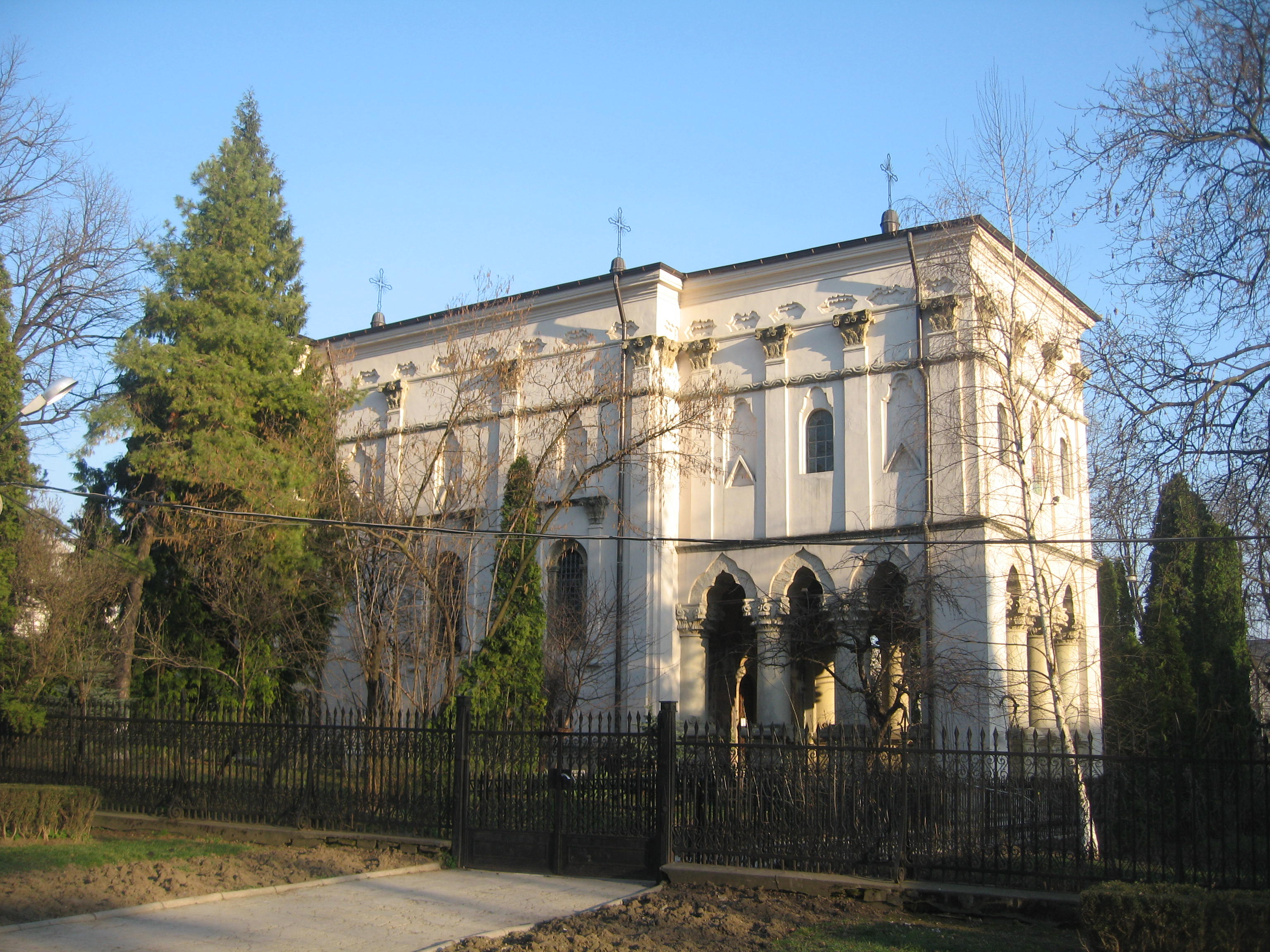
St. George Church (Old Metropolitan Cathedral)

==== Pilgrimage ====
The city has become a major Christian pilgrimage site since the early modern period. In 1641, the relics of Saint Parascheva were brought to Iași. Each year, around 14 October, hundreds of thousands of pilgrims gather to commemorate Saint Parascheva, while the city itself established its Celebration Days at the same time. The October pilgrimage is one of the largest in Europe, drawing people all over Romania as well as from neighbouring Orthodox countries.

During the entire year, pilgrimages to Iași can also involve visits to a large number of religious sites, both within and around the city.

=== Gardens, parks and natural landmarks ===
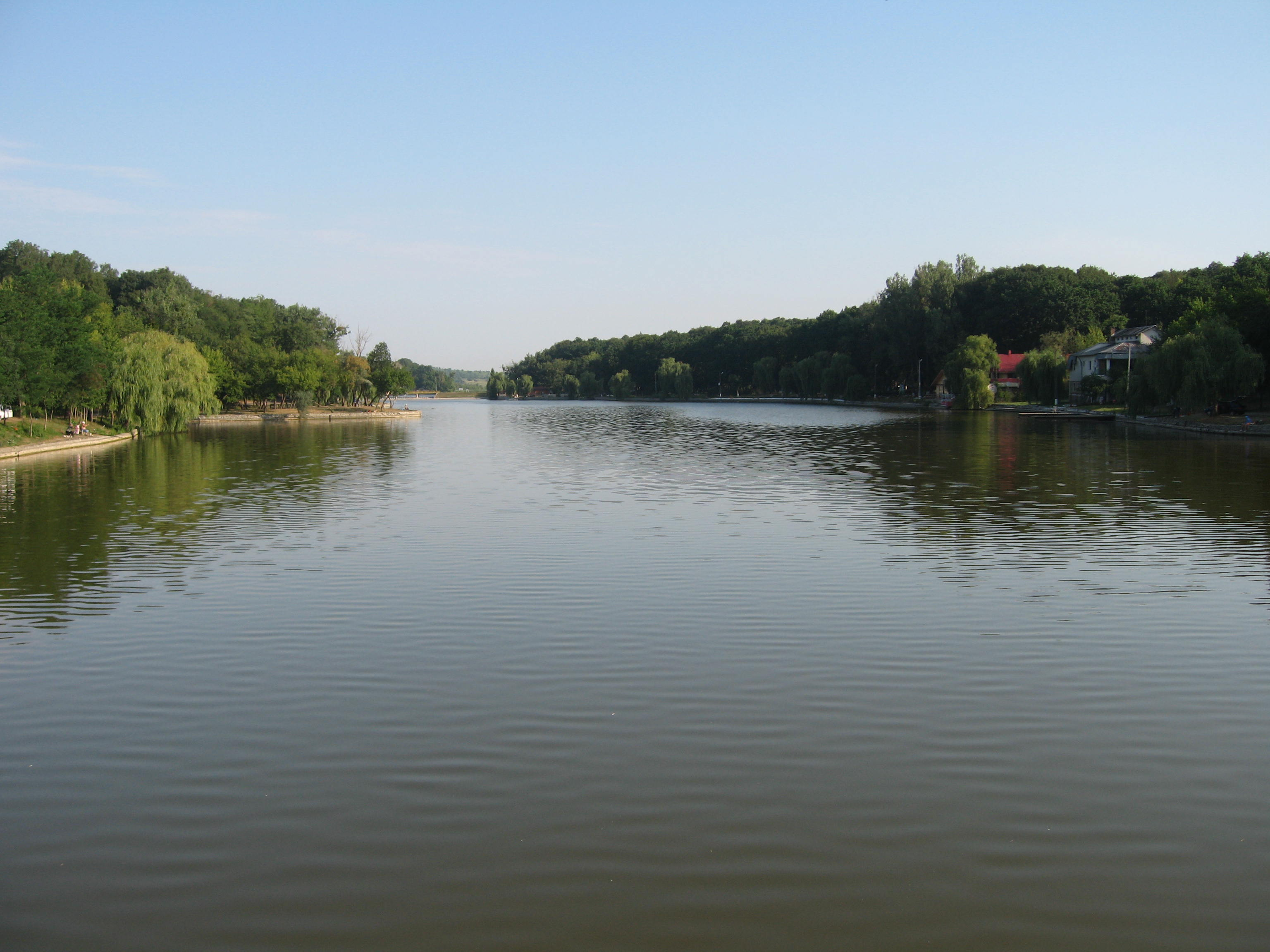
Ciric Park

Iași has a diverse array of public spaces, from city squares to public parks.

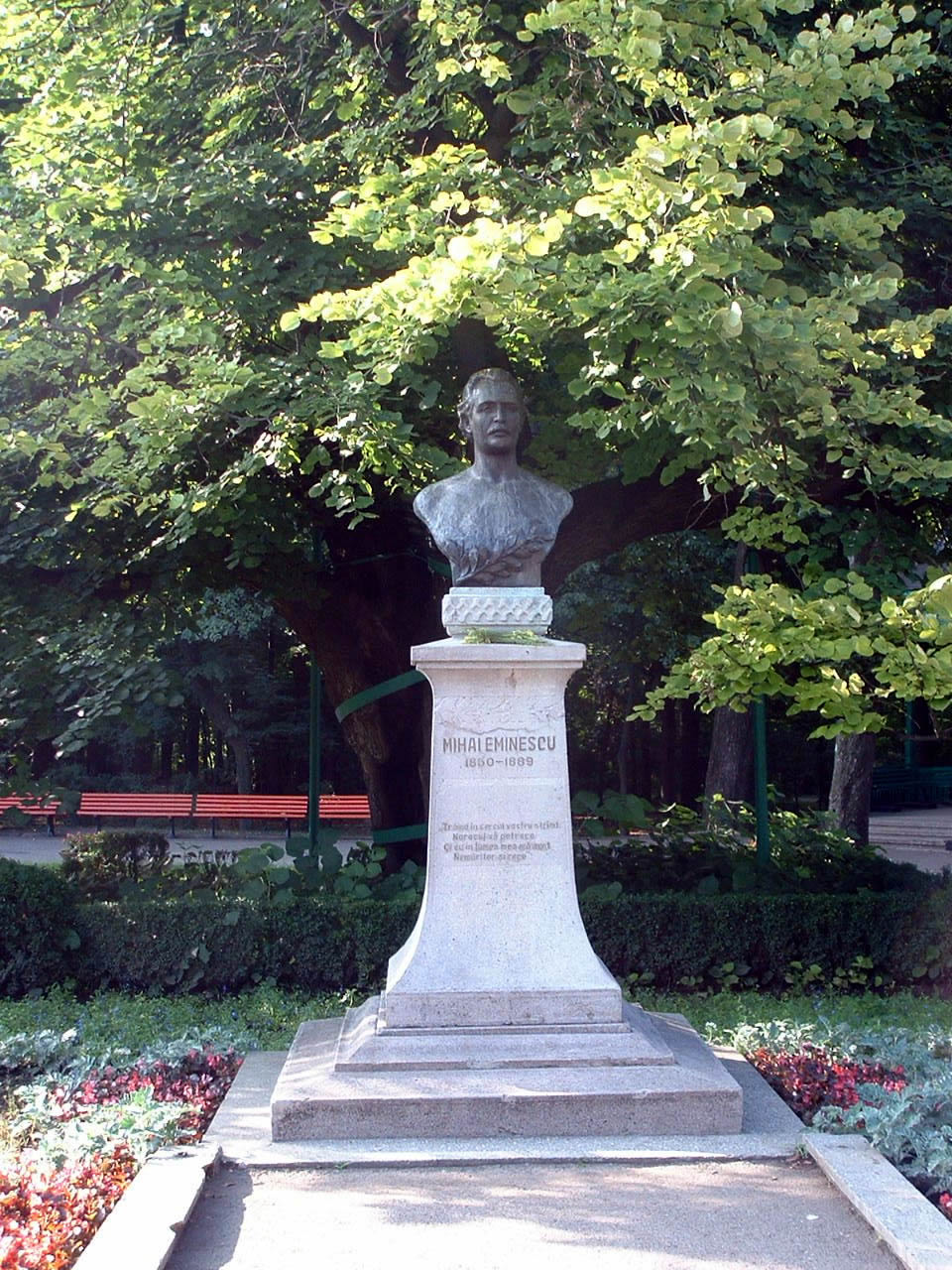
Mihai Eminescu's statue and his Linden Tree in Copou Park

Begun in 1833, at the time when Iași was the capital of Moldavia, by Prince Mihail Sturdza and under the plans of Gheorghe Asachi and Mihail Singurov, Copou Park was integrated into the city and marks one of the first Romanian coordinated public parks. The oldest monument in Romania stands in the middle of the park, the Obelisk of Lions (1834), a 13.5 m (44.29 ft) tall obelisk, dedicated to the Regulamentul Organic, the first law on political, administrative and juridical organisation in Romanian Principalities.

Founded in 1856, the Botanical Garden of Iași, the first botanical garden in Romania, has an area of over 100 hectares, and more than 10,000 species of plants.

Iași Exhibition Park was opened in 1923 and built under the co-ordination of the architect N. Ghica Budești.

The Ciric Park, located in the north-eastern part of Iași, consists of parkland and four lakes.

Eminescu's Linden Tree (Romanian: Teiul lui Eminescu) is a 500-year-old silver linden (Tilia tomentosa Moench) situated in Copou Park. Mihai Eminescu reportedly wrote some of his best works underneath this linden tree, rendering it one of Romania's most important natural monuments and a notable Iași landmark. The Odd Poplars Alley, in Bucium neighbourhood, is another spot where Mihai Eminescu sought inspiration (the poem "Down Where the Lonely Poplars Grow"). In 1973, the 15 white poplars still left (with the age ranges between 233 and 371 years) were declared natural monuments.

Iași County has 387 centuries-old trees, of which 224 were declared monument trees and 160 got the Romanian Academy's approval and are proposed for such a classification. Most of them are oak or linden trees. The oldest tree in the county is the 675-year-old hybrid linden (Tilia) tree located in the courtyard of Bârnova Monastery, in the vicinity of Iași. When the linden was about 57 years old and about 14 cm (5.5 in) in diameter, Iași was mentioned as an urban settlement, during the reign of Prince Alexander the Good (1408).

== Demographics ==
Historical population
| Year | Pop. | ±% |
|---|---|---|
| 1774 | 15,000 | — |
| 1803 | 20,000 | +33.3% |
| 1820 | 25,000 | +25.0% |
| 1831 | 59,880 | +139.5% |
| 1851 | 70,000 | +16.9% |
| 1859 | 65,745 | −6.1% |
| 1900 | 78,067 | +18.7% |
| 1912 | 75,229 | −3.6% |
| 1930 | 102,872 | +36.7% |
| 1941 | 111,669 | +8.6% |
| 1948 | 94,075 | −15.8% |
| 1956 | 112,977 | +20.1% |
| 1966 | 161,023 | +42.5% |
| 1977 | 265,002 | +64.6% |
| 1992 | 344,425 | +30.0% |
| 2002 | 320,888 | −6.8% |
| 2011 | 290,422 | −9.5% |
| 2021 | 271,692 | −6.4% |
Sources: 1774, 1803, 1820, 1831, 1859, 1851, 1900, 1912 Census, 1930, 1956–2011: Censuses, 1941, 1948.

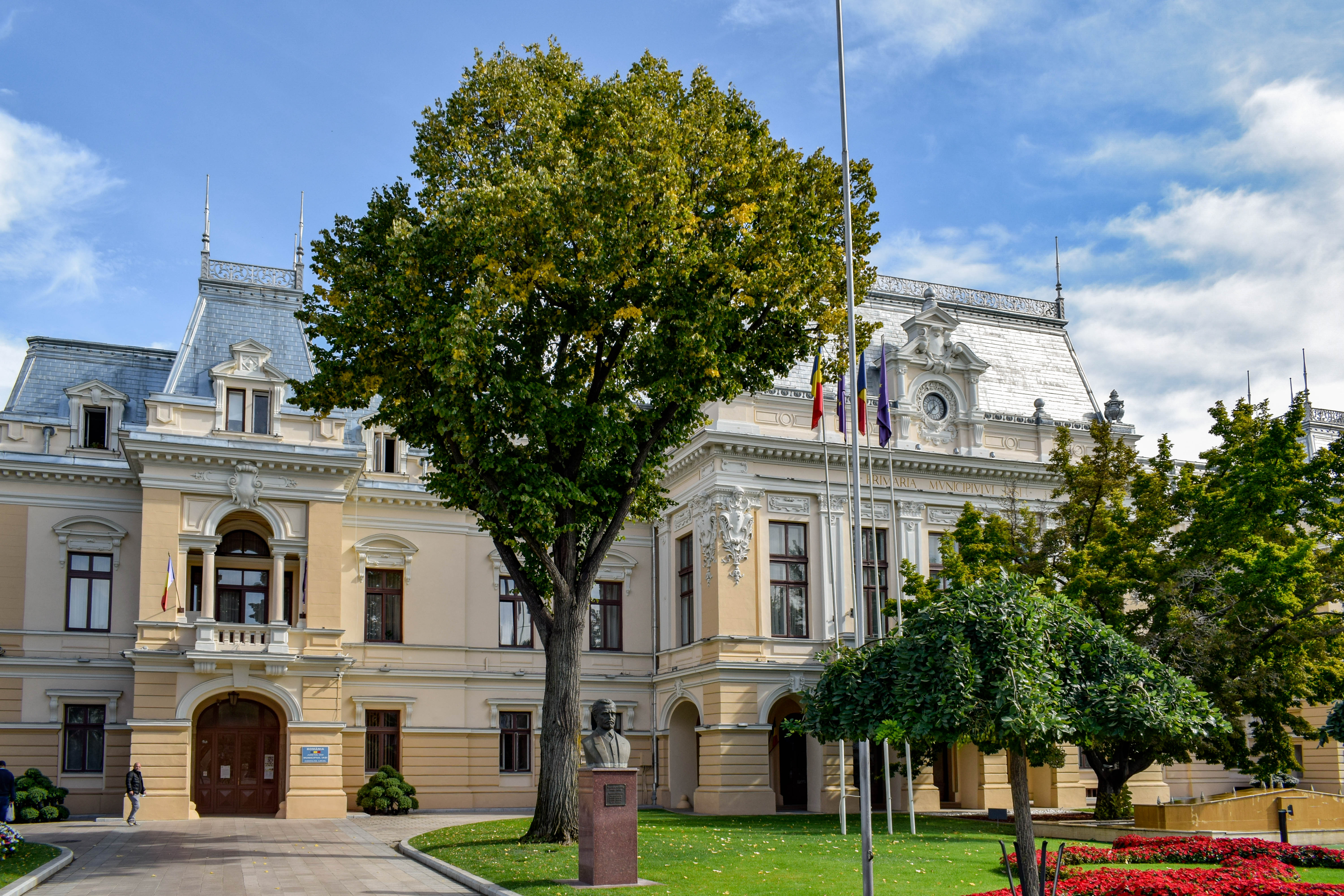
Roznovanu Palace, today Iași City Hall

As of 2021 census, with 271,692 inhabitants, Iași is the country's third most populous city. With a population of 500,668 residents (2018), the Iași urban area is the second largest in Romania.

As of 2021, the Iași metropolitan area (which includes Iași and 19 other nearby communities) had a population of 423,154, while Iași County, with its 760,774 inhabitants, was the most populous county in Romania (after the Municipality of Bucharest). Additionally there were 60,000 more residents (mostly students) and thousands of daily commuters.

According to the 2002 census, in Iași there were 109,357 housing units and 320,888 people living within the city proper. Of this population, 98.5% were ethnic Romanians, while 0.59% were ethnic Romani, 0.13% Jews, 0.13% Greeks, 0.13% Lipovans, 0.08% Hungarians, 0.05% Germans and 0.39% others. In terms of religion, 92.5% of the population were Christian Orthodox, 4.9% Roman Catholic, other religious groups 2.6%. There are currently almost 10,000 Roman Catholics living in Iași. There is a debate between historians as to whether the Catholics are originally of Romanian or Hungarian descent.

== Economy ==
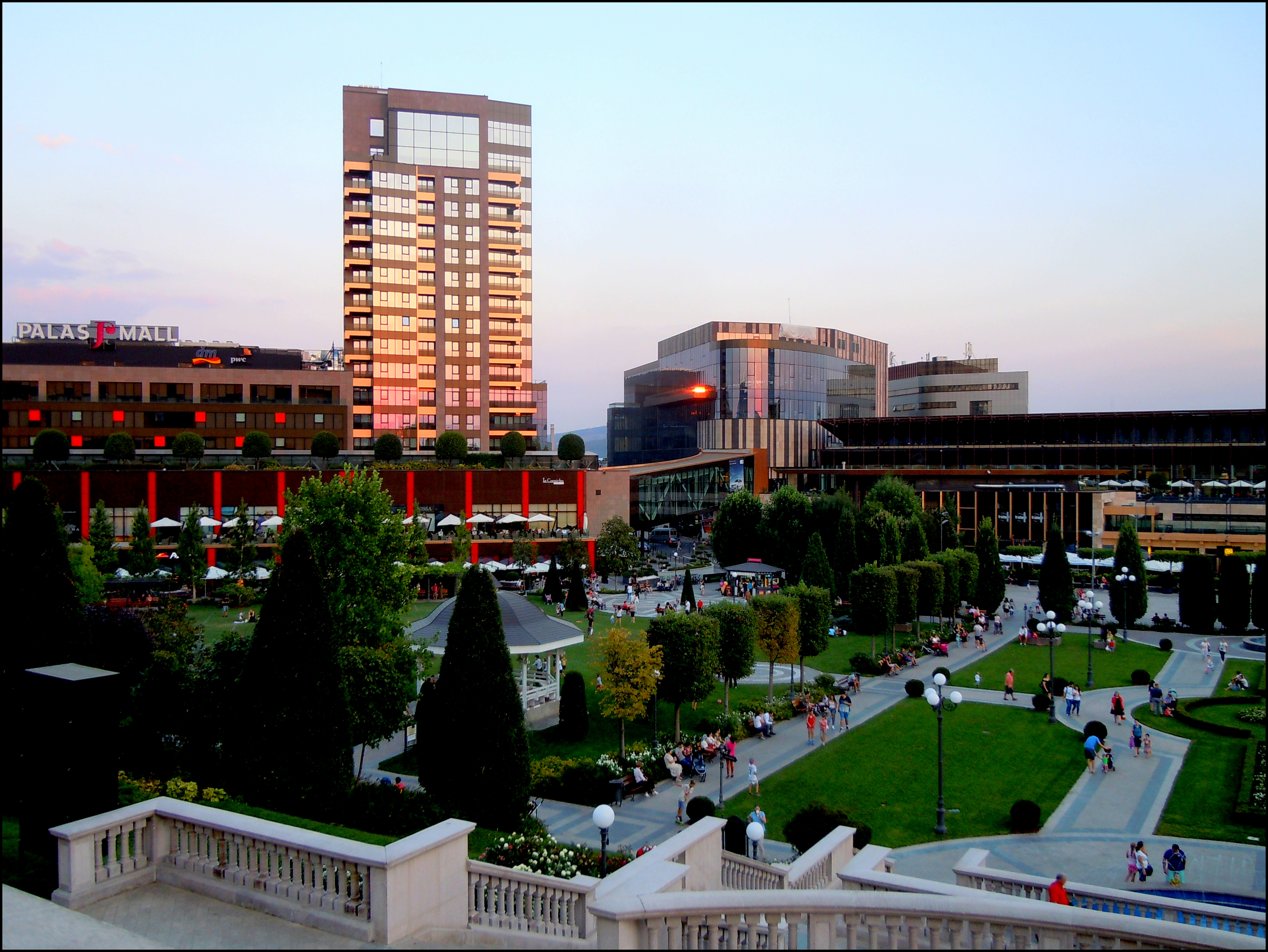
Palas commercial and business centre

Iași is an important economic centre in Romania. The local and regional economy relies on industry and service sector institutions and establishments. The most important service sectors are related to education, health care, banking, research, culture, government and tourism.

The city is an important information technology sector centre, with the presence of several large multinational companies (Amazon, Oracle, Continental, Conduent, Xerox, Accenture, Capgemini, SCC) and many other local and foreign companies such as Bentley Systems, Bitdefender, Comodo, Endava, Ness, Pentalog, or TiVo (to name a few), as well as two universities which offer specific degree programmes. Industry forecasts expect the Iași ITC workforce to grow from the current 16,000 (end of 2016) employees to more than 33,000, by 2030.

An estimated workforce of more than 35,000 employees is active in Iași's industrial manufacturing sector, particularly in automotive (Delphi, Lear, Conex Distribution), pharmaceutical industry (Antibiotice Iași, Fiterman Pharma, Ircon SRL), metallurgical production (ArcelorMittal, Technosteel LBR), aerospace (BMT Aerospace), industrial equipment (Agmus, ASAM, Fortus), energy (E.ON Moldova Distribuție, Veolia Energie), textiles and clothing (Benetton, Iași Conf, Iașitex), home appliances (Tehnoton), building materials (Brikston, Build Corp), food (Compan, Panifcom, Zeelandia).

Located in an area recognised for its vineyards and wines, Iași is part of a traditional wine region with viticultural centres surrounding the city: Copou, Bucium, Uricani, Comarna, Plugari, and Probota. Iași County is also home to renowned Cotnari and Bohotin vineyards.

With large shopping malls and commercial centres located in the area, Iași also has a well-developed retail business.

=== Largest employers ===
Top 10 Employers
| Company | Industry | Employees |
|---|---|---|
| Sf. Spiridon University Hospital | Health care | 2,944 |
| BorgWarner | Automotive industry | 2,612 |
| Alexandru Ioan Cuza University | High education | 2,021 |
| Continental Automotive Romania | Automotive engineering | 2,000 |
| Amazon Development Center | IT services | 1,956 |
| Gheorghe Asachi Technical University | High education | 1,710 |
| AlmavivA Services | Customer services | 1,486 |
| Antibiotice Iași | Pharmaceutical industry | 1,415 |
| CTP Iași | Public transport | 1,349 |
| ApaVital | Water industry | 1,347 |

== Politics and administration ==
The city's current local council has the following multi-party political composition, based on the results of the ballots cast at the 2024 Romanian local elections:

| Party | Seats | Current Council |
|---|---|---|
| National Liberal Party (PNL) | 7 | |
| United Right Alliance (ADU) | 7 | |
| Social Democratic Party (PSD) | 6 | |
| Alliance for the Union of Romanians (AUR) | 4 | |
| Romania ECO | 3 | |

== Culture ==
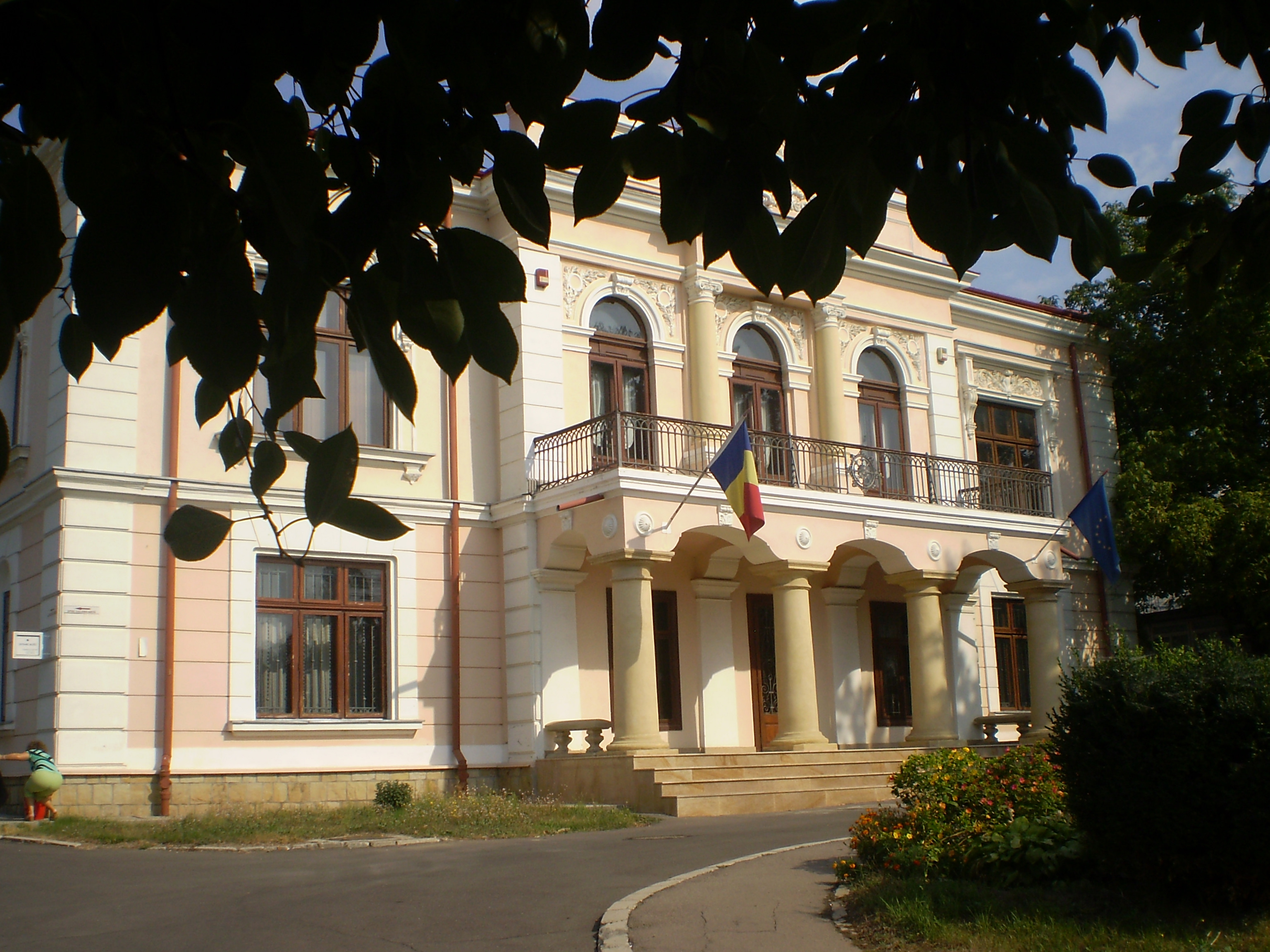
Pogor House, the Romanian Literature Museum

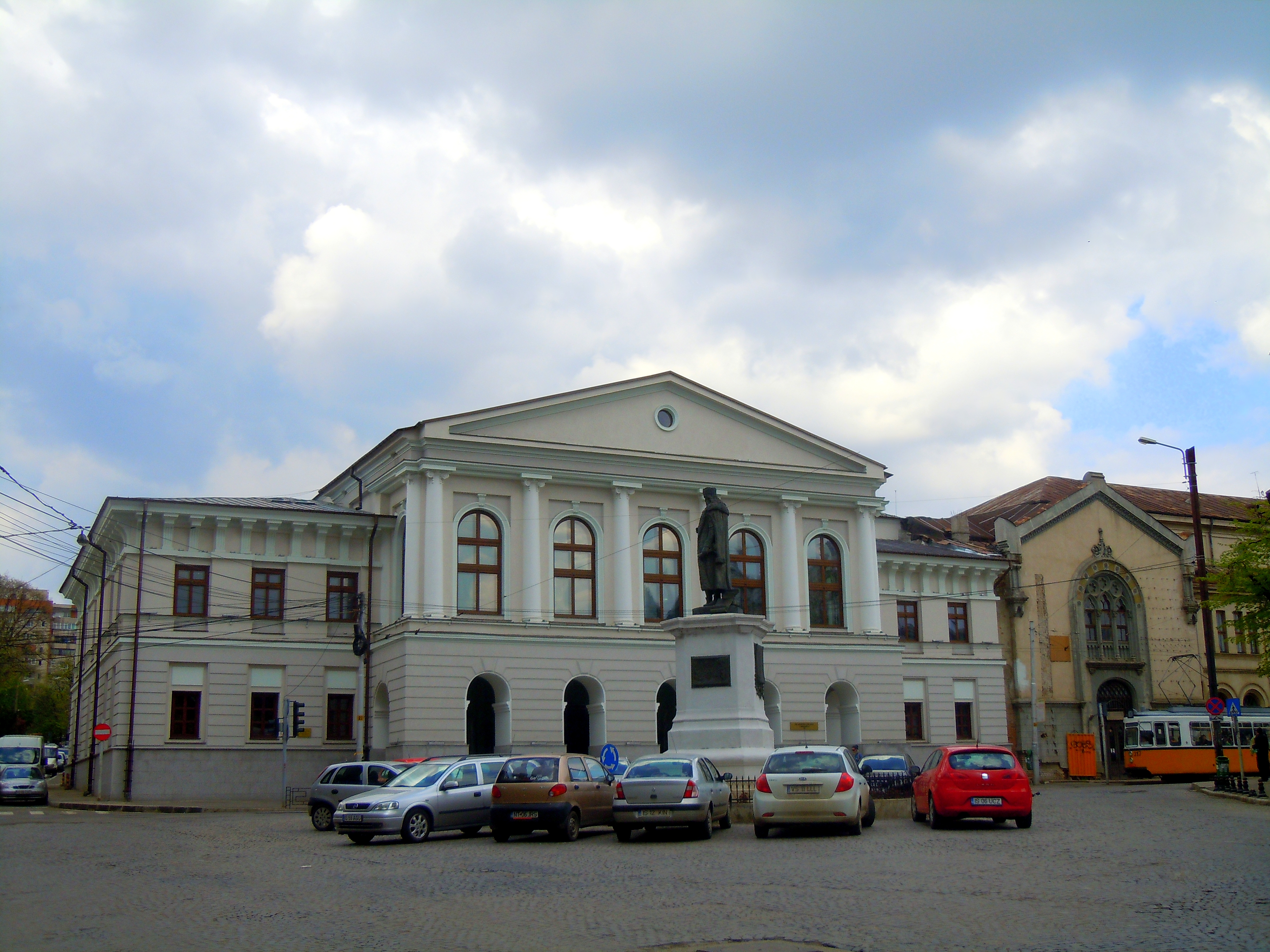
Alecu Balș House, where Franz Liszt performed in 1847, nowadays Moldova State Philharmonic

Major events in the political and cultural history of Moldavia are connected with the name of the city of Iași. The great scholars of the 17th century, Grigore Ureche, Miron Costin and later Ion Neculce, wrote most of their works in the city or not far from it and the famous scholar Dimitrie Cantemir known throughout all Europe also linked his name to the capital of Moldavia.

The first newspaper in Romanian was published in 1829 in Iași and it is in Iași where, in 1867, appeared under literary society Junimea, the Convorbiri Literare review in which Ion Creangă’s Childhood Memories and the best poems by Mihai Eminescu were published. The reviews Contemporanul and Viața Românească appeared in 1871, respectively in 1906 with great contributions to promoting Romanian national cultural values.

Many great personalities of Romanian culture are connected to Iași: the chronicler Nicolae Milescu, the historians and politicians Mihail Kogălniceanu and Simion Bărnuțiu, the poets Vasile Alecsandri and George Topârceanu, the writers Mihail Sadoveanu, Alecu Russo, and Ionel Teodoreanu, the literary critic Titu Maiorescu, the historian A.D. Xenopol, the philosophers Vasile Conta and Petre Andrei, the sociologist Dimitrie Gusti, the geographer Emil Racoviță and the painter Octav Băncilă, only to name a few.

=== Theatres and orchestras ===
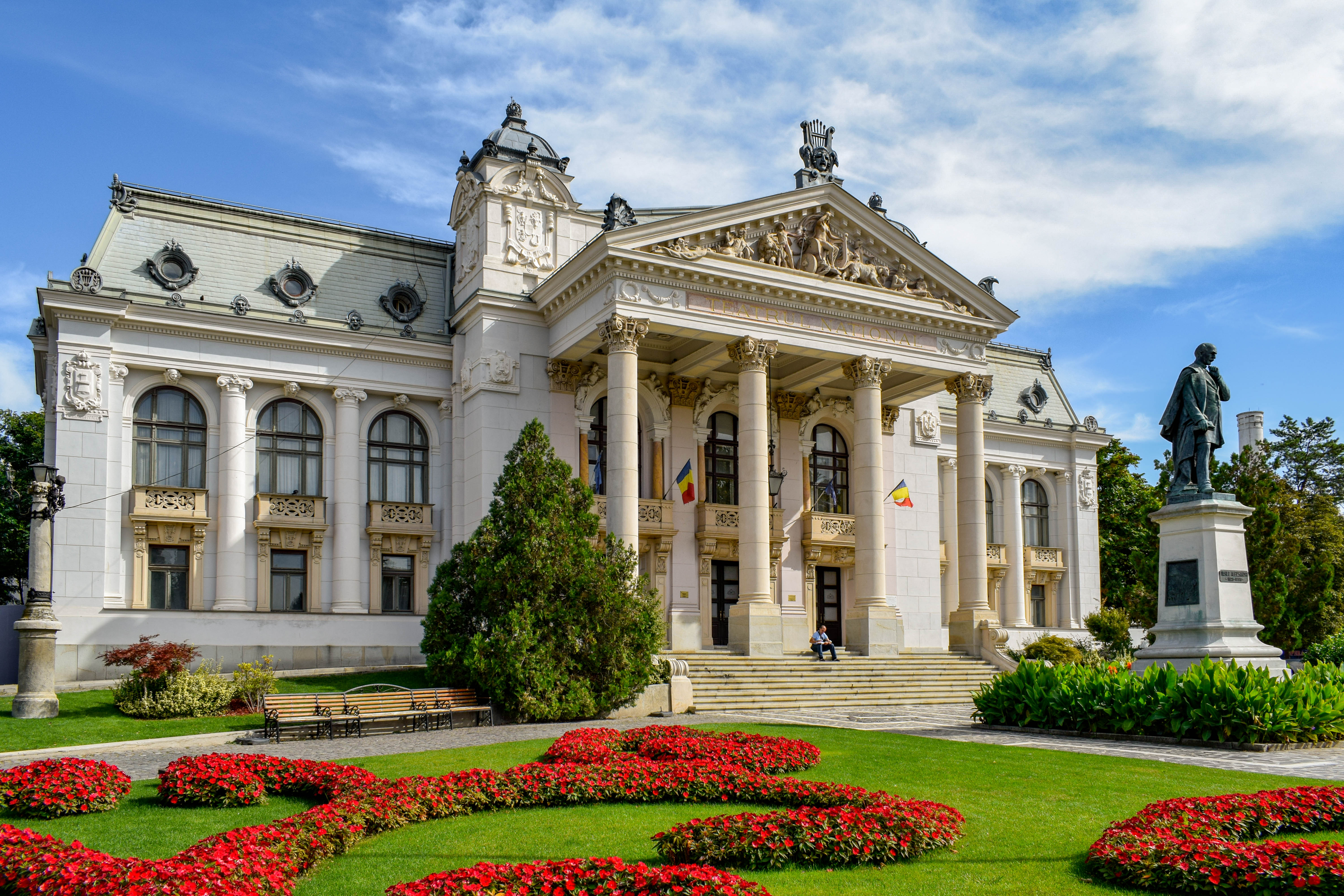
Vasile Alecsandri National Theatre and Iași Romanian National Opera

Luceafărul Theatre

The Vasile Alecsandri National Theatre, opened in 1840, is the first National Theatre in Romania. The building, designed according to the plans of the Viennese architects Hermann Helmer and Ferdinand Fellner, was raised between 1894 and 1896, and also hosts, starting 1956, the Iași Romanian National Opera.

Iași is also home to:

- Moldova State Philharmonic Orchestra
- Luceafărul Theatre
- Iași Athenaeum (also known as Tătărași Athenaeum)
- Ludic Student Theatre
- Teatru Fix

=== Museums ===
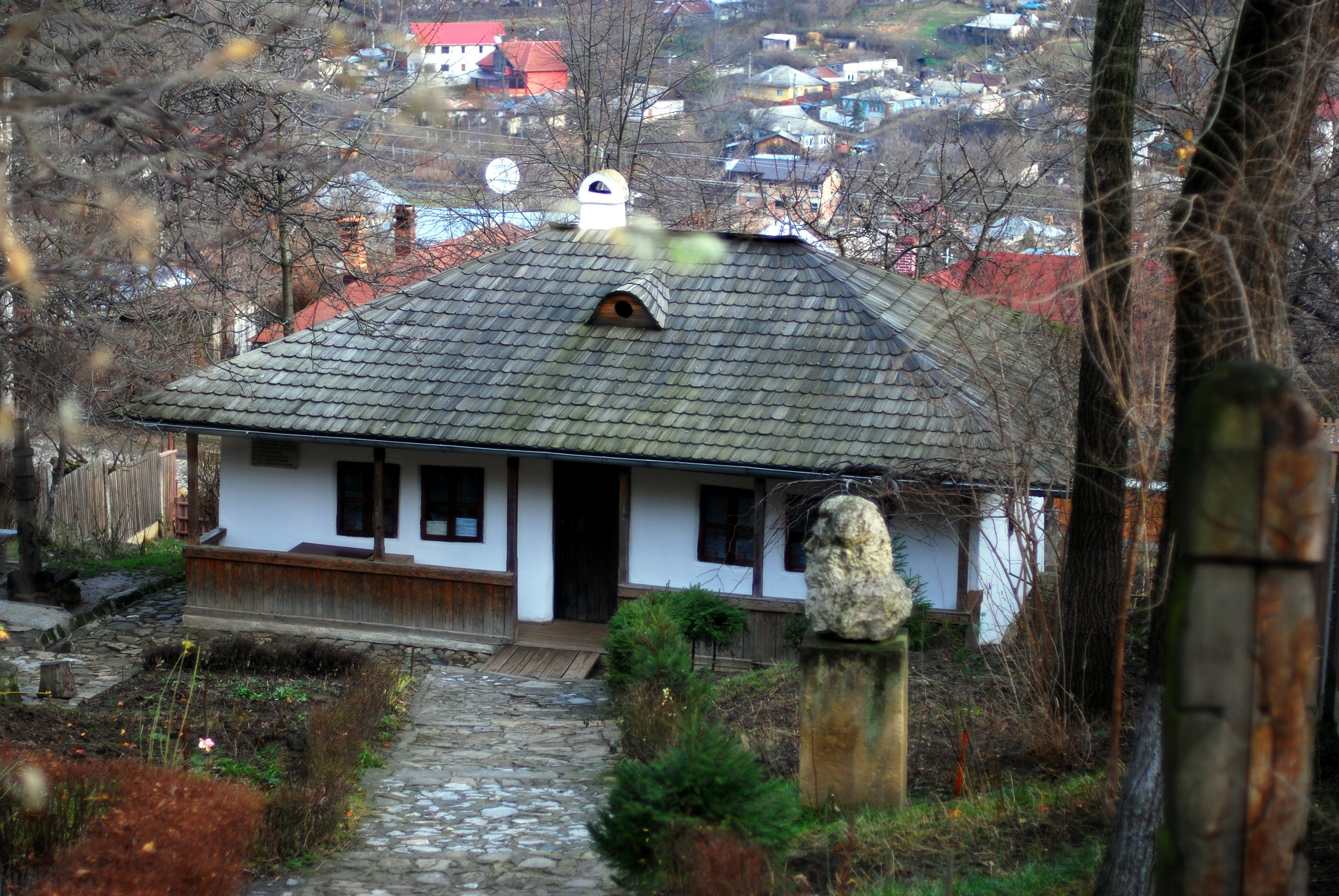
Ion Creangă Memorial House

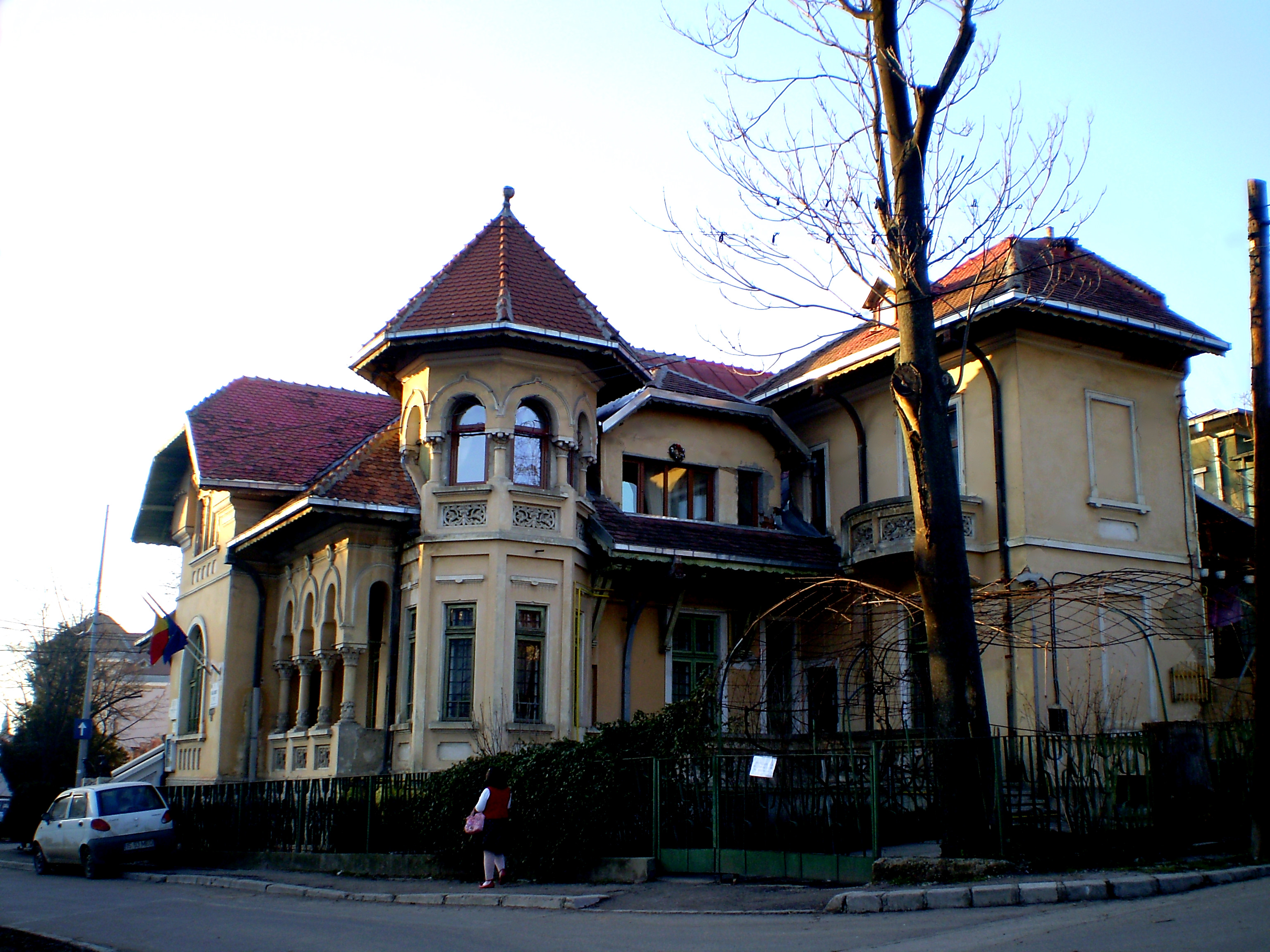
Mihai Codreanu Memorial House

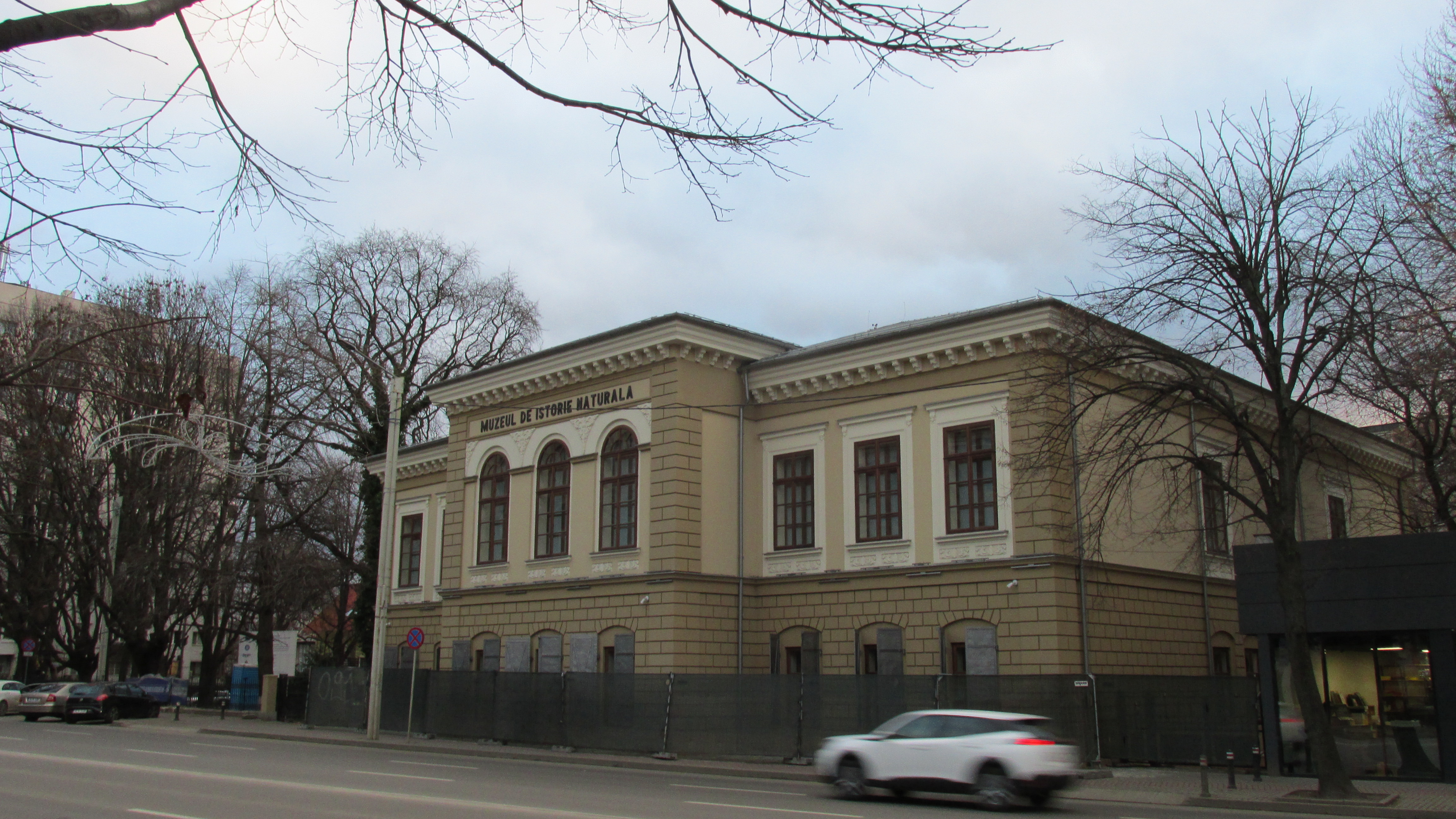
Iași Museum of Natural History

Iași is home to many museums, memorial houses, and art galleries.

The first memorial museum from Romania opened in Iași in 1918, as the Ion Creangă Memorial House, and today the Iași National Museum of Romanian Literature owns several memorial houses and museums. The Mihai Eminescu Museum, situated in Copou Park, is dedicated to the great poet's life and creation; other museums are dedicated to: Dosoftei, Mihail Kogălniceanu, Vasile Alecsandri, Mihai Codreanu, Vasile Pogor, Otilia Cazimir, Mihail Sadoveanu, George Topîrceanu, Nicolae Gane, Constantin Negruzzi, Garabet Ibrăileanu, Ionel Teodoreanu, Petru Poni, Radu Cernătescu, Cezar Petrescu, and Dimitrie Anghel.

The Theatre Museum, opened in 1976 at the celebration of 160 years since the first theatrical performance in Romanian, illustrates the development of the theatrical phenomenon since the beginning, important moments of the history of Iași National Theatre, the foundation, in 1840, of the Philharmonic-dramatic Conservatoire, prestigious figures that have contributed to the development of the Romanian theatre.

The Union Museum, includes original pieces and documents which belonged to prince Al. I. Cuza and his family.

The Museum of Natural History, founded on 4 February 1834, is the first museum of this kind in Romania with over 300,000 items, the most valuable being the collections of insects, mollusc, amphibians, reptiles, birds, plants and minerals.

Four other museums are located in the Palace of Culture: with its roots dating back to 1860, the Iași Art Museum is the oldest of its kind in Romania, and, with more than 8,700 works (many of them belonging to the universal patrimony), has the largest art collection in the country; the Moldavia's History Museum, offers more than 48,000 objects from various fields, archaeology, numismatics, decorative art, ancient books, documents; the Ethnographic Museum of Moldavia owns more than 13,000 objects depicting the Romanian advance through the ages; the Science and Technology Museum's collection has more than 11,200 objects in five distinct sections and one memorial house.

In May 2016, the Iași Municipal Museum was re-established, while in July 2021 four new museums, located in the House of Museums, were opened to the public: the Museum of Iași Pogrom, the Museum of the Jewish Theatre in Romania, the Museum of Poetry, and the Museum of Childhood under Communism. Iași is home to the Gheorghe Asachi Technical University Library, voted the most beautiful library in the world in a 2015 online poll. The library is situated within the historical University Palace, a building designed by architects Louis Blanc and Petru Poni, who drew inspiration from prominent European academic architecture.

=== Foreign culture centres ===
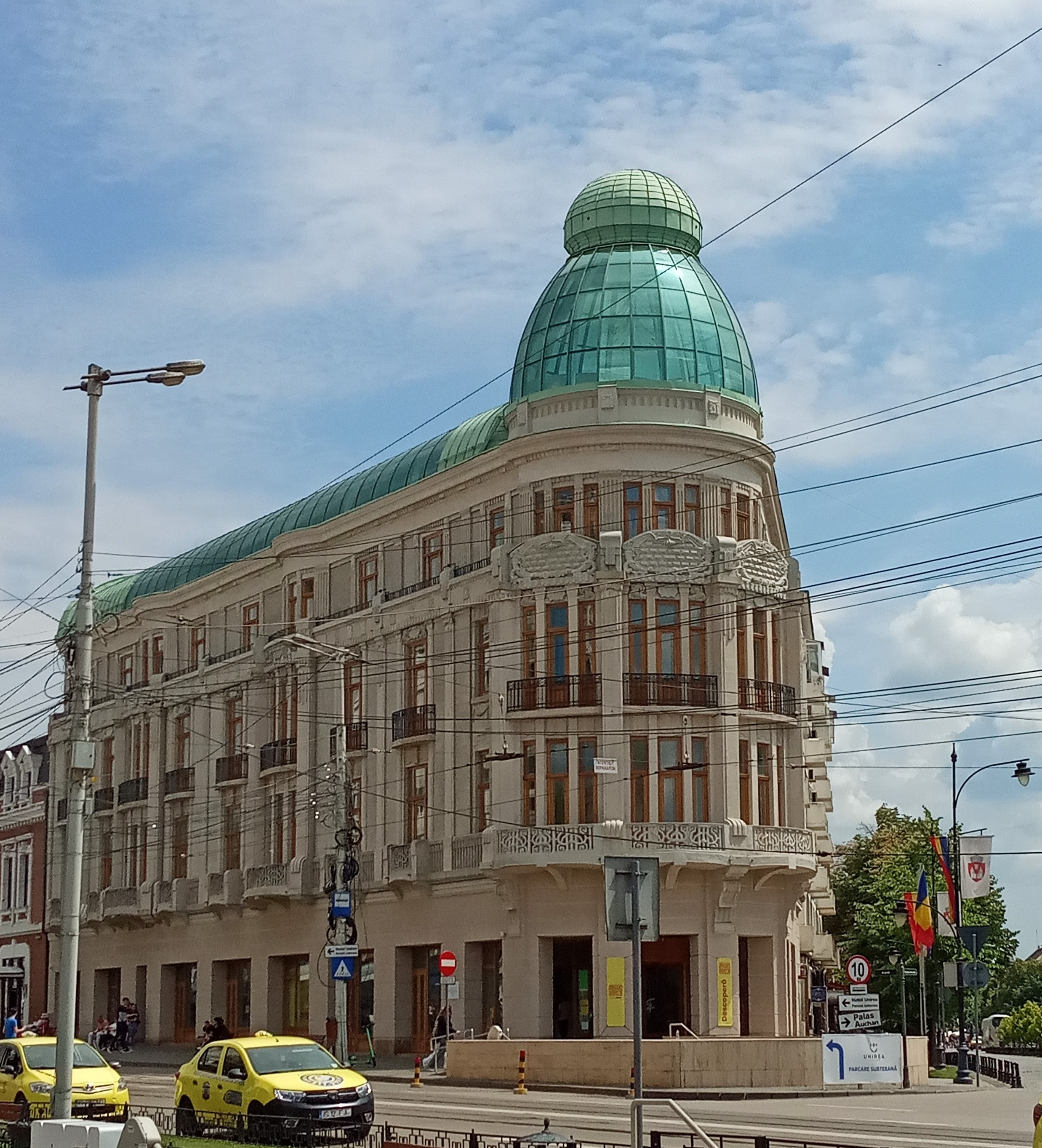
Braunstein Palace (Union Square), hosts both the French Institute and the German Cultural Center

Iași hosts six cultural centres: French, German, British, Latin American & Caribbean, Hellenic, and Arab.

=== Cultural events and festivals ===
- FIE (International Education Festival), launched in 2013, is a mix of cultural and educative events;
- International Theatre Festival for Young Audience was launched in 2008 and it is hosted each October by Luceafărul Theatre;
- Since 2010 at SFR(Romanian Film Nights) are presented films from different periods of Romanian cinema, as well as new films, debut films or short films, with the invitation of actors, directors, scriptwriters and film critics in the projection;
- FILIT (International Festival of Literature and Translation) is a yearly literature and translation festival organised through the Iași Museum of Romanian Literature, begun in 2013;
- Started in 2017, afterhills is the biggest music festival in Moldavia. Other music festivals: Rock'n'Iași since 2007 and Rocanotherworld since 2016.
- Hangariada is an aeronautics and art festival organised each year in May;

Live music and different other artistic events (poetry nights, readings) are a habitual occurrence in the various bars and coffee shops the city has to offer.

== Education ==
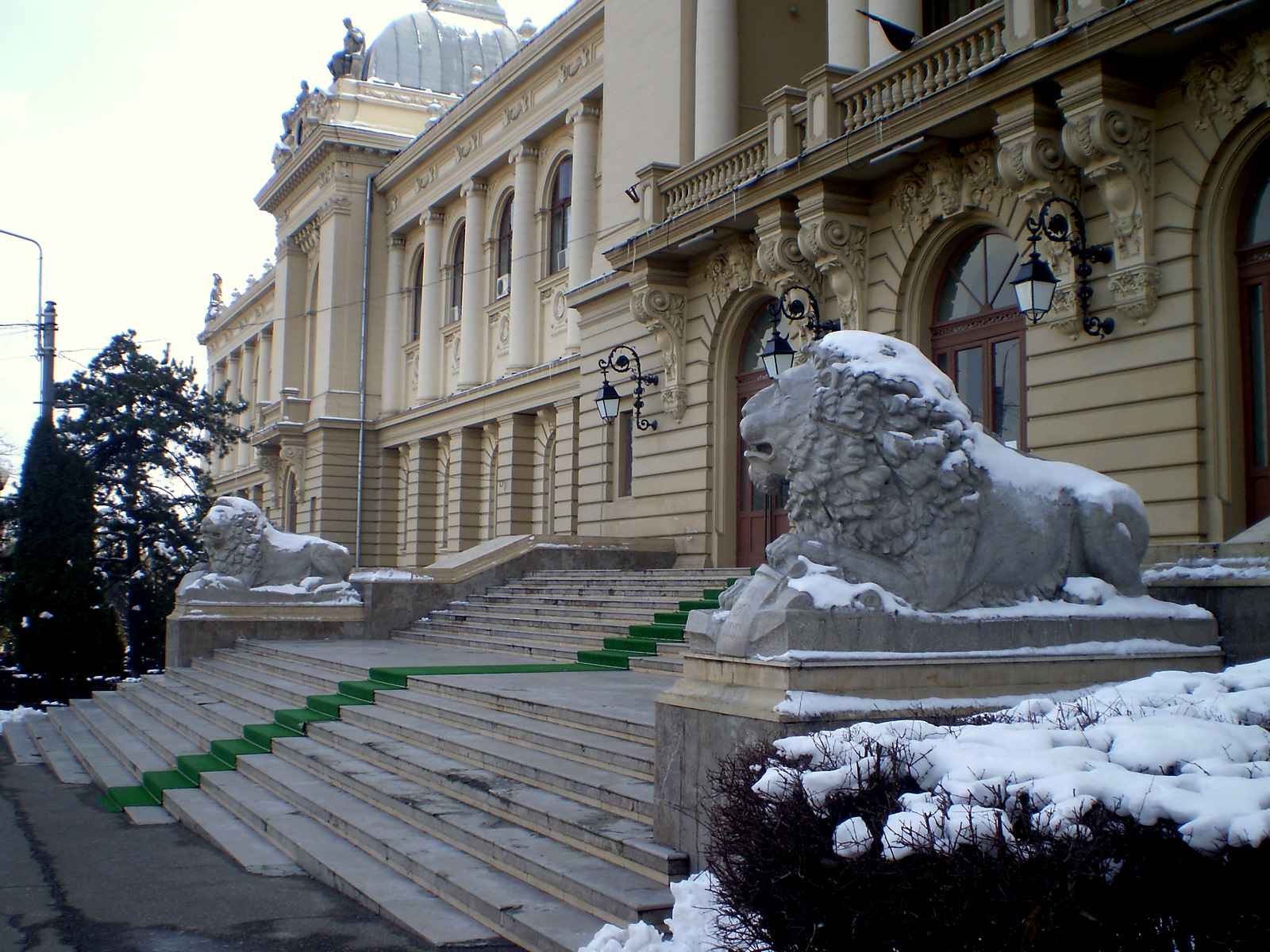
Al. I. Cuza University

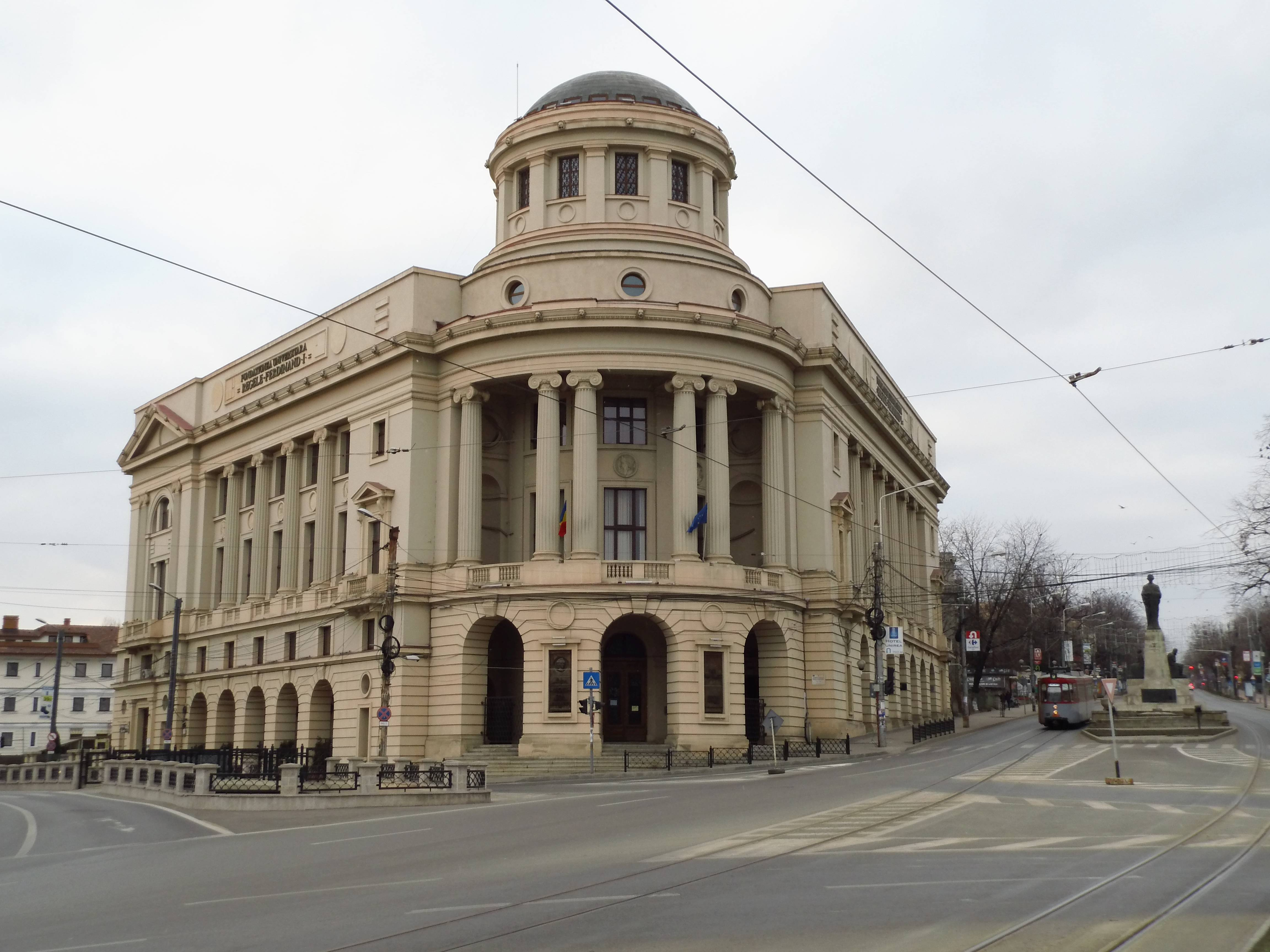
Central University Library

The first institute of higher learning that functioned on the territory of Romania was Academia Vasiliană (1640) founded by Prince Vasile Lupu as a "higher school for Latin and Slavonic languages," followed by the Princely Academy in 1707.

The first high education structure in Romanian was established in the autumn of 1813, when engineer Gheorghe Asachi laid the foundations of a class of engineers, its activities taking place within the Greek Hegemonic School.

After 1813, other moments marked the development of higher education in Romanian, regarding both humanities and the technical science. In 1835, Academia Mihăileană founded by Prince Mihail Sturdza is considered first Romanian superior institute in the country.

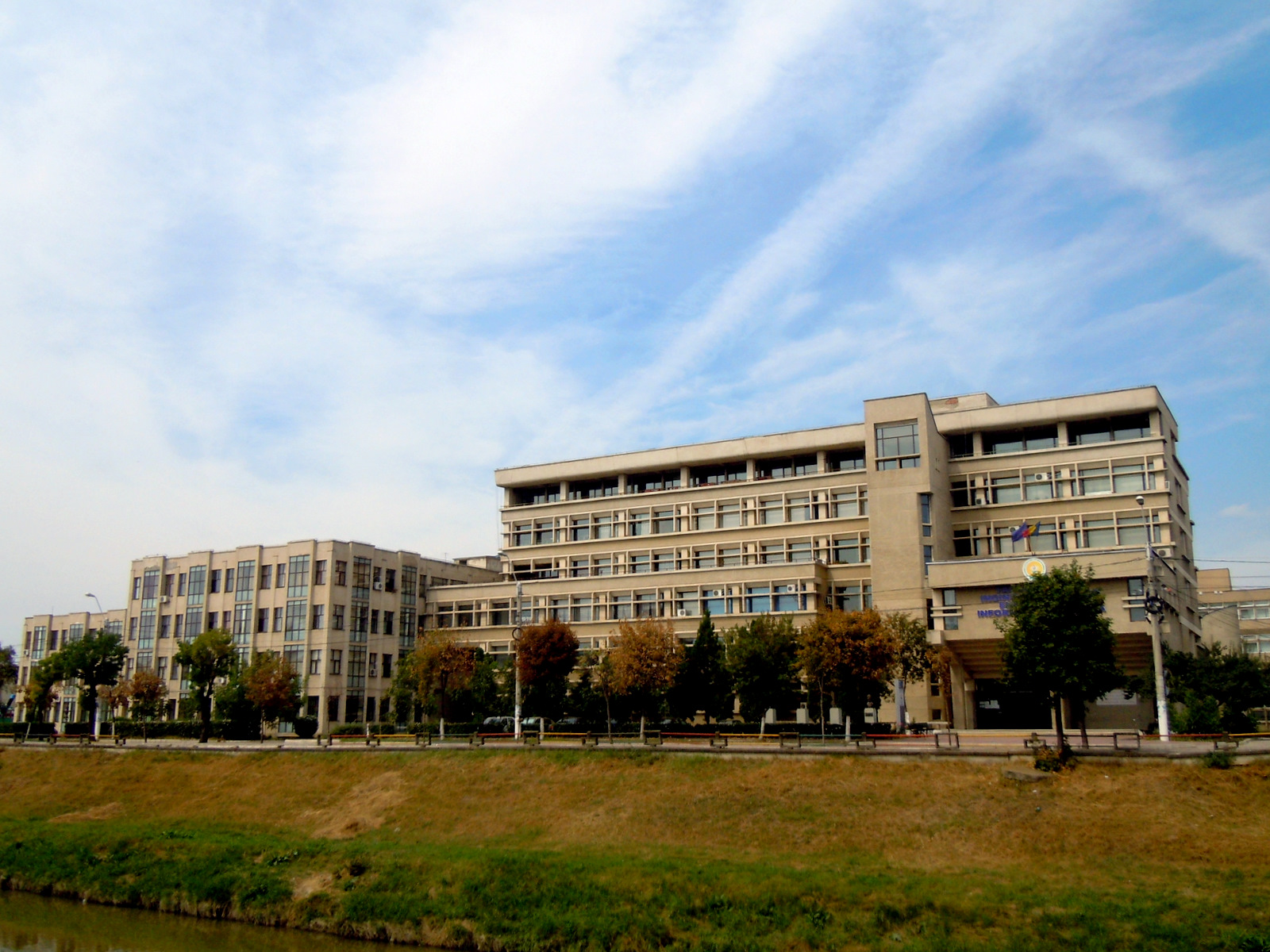
Faculty of Electrical Engineering, Gheorghe Asachi Technical University

In 1860, three faculties part of the Academia Mihăileană formed the nucleus for the newly established University of Iași, the first Romanian university.

The Physicians and Naturalists Society, founded in Iași, has existed since the early part of the 19th century, and a number of periodicals are published. One of the oldest medical universities in Romania, founded in 1879, is located in Iași. It is now known as the Grigore T. Popa University of Medicine and Pharmacy.

In 1937, the two applied science sections of the University of Iași became departments of the newly created Gheorghe Asachi Polytechnic School. In the period before and after World War II, the later (renamed Polytechnic Institute in 1948) extended its domain of activity, especially in the field of engineering, and became known as Gheorghe Asachi Technical University in 1993.

Public universities include:

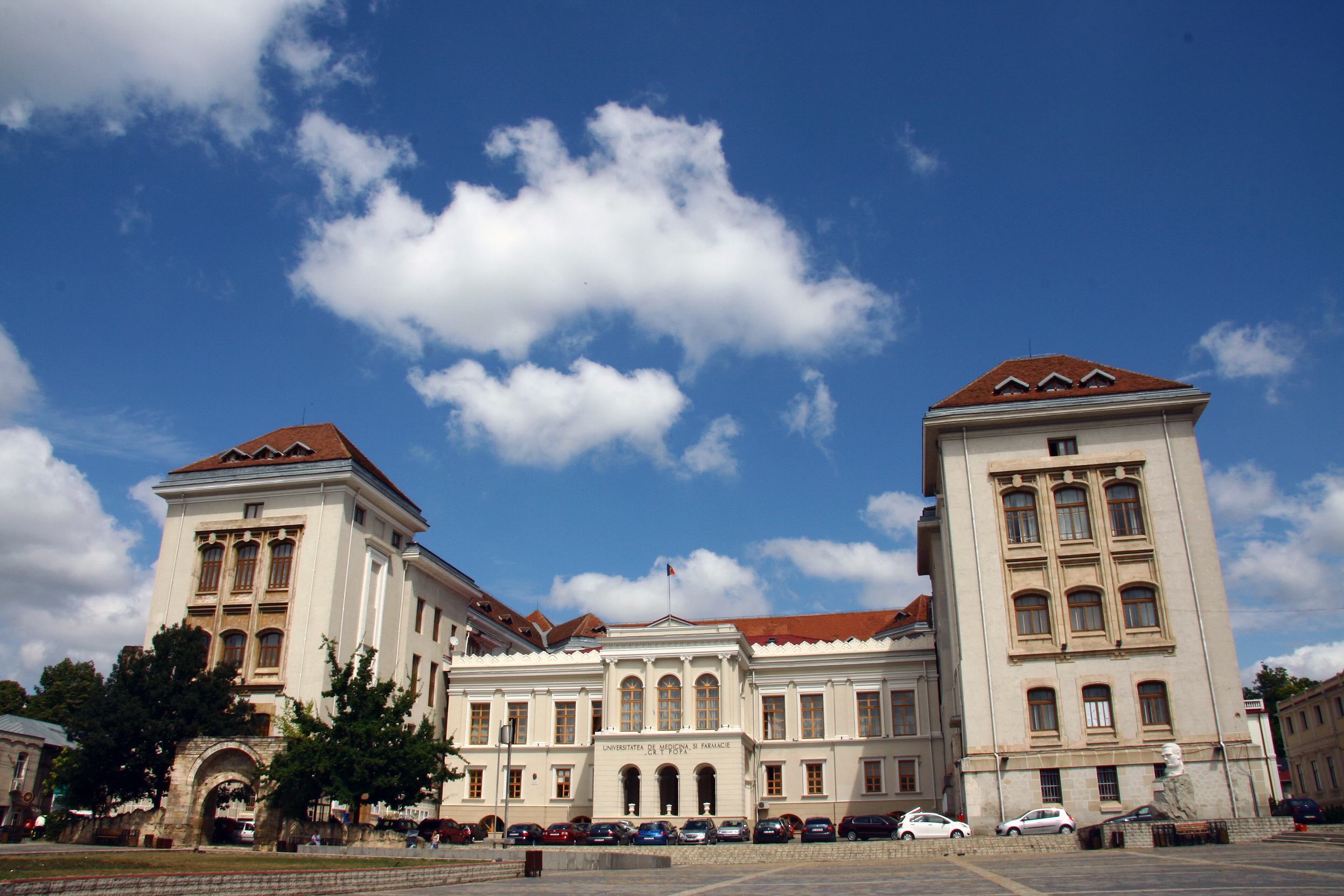
University of Medicine and Pharmacy

- Alexandru Ioan Cuza University- situated in Copou, is the oldest higher education institution in Romania;
- Gheorghe Asachi Technical University – the school with the oldest engineering tradition in Romania;
- Grigore T. Popa University of Medicine and Pharmacy – one of the oldest medicine schools in Romania;
- George Enescu National University of Arts – the oldest tradition in music and arts education in Romania;
- Ion Ionescu de la Brad University of Life Sciences – one of the oldest schools of its kind.

There are also some private higher education institutions including Petre Andrei University, the largest private university in the historical region of Moldavia.

The Central University Library of Iași, where the chief records of Romanian history are preserved, is the oldest and the second largest in Romania.

As of 2016, Iași has 74 public schools, coordinated by the Iași County School Inspectorate. The city is also home to 19 private schools.

Notable high schools:

- Iași National College (1828)
- Costache Negruzzi National College (1895)
- Emil Racoviță National College (1964)
- Mihai Eminescu National College (1865)
- Vasile Lupu Pedagogical High School (1855)

Iași Science Festival is a week long festival organised every year in April (starting 2013) for high school and grade school students to get be able to observe and take part in scientific experiments and be given detailed tours of the scientific and technical universities and research labs in Iași. Over 200 experiments were performed and over 10,000 students took part in the 2014 edition, from throughout the Moldavia region.

== Sports ==
In 2012, Iași was selected as one of the European Cities of Sport. The city also recently hosted the International Esports Federation (IESF) World Championships 2023, in which it was participated by 111 countries around the world.

=== Current teams ===
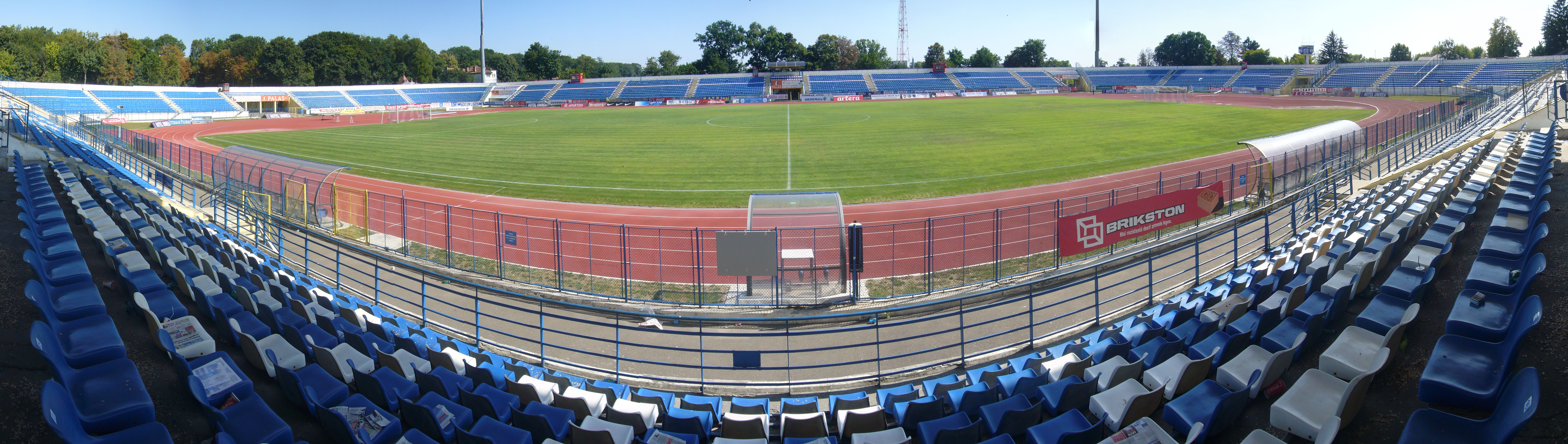
Panorama of Emil Alexandrescu Stadium, home to the FC Politehnica

| Sport | League | Club | Founded | Venue |
|---|---|---|---|---|
| Football | Liga II | FC Politehnica Iași (2010) (as the informal successor to Politehnica Iași) | 16 August 2010 | Emil Alexandrescu Stadium |
| Basketball | Men's Liga I | CS Politehnica Iași | 1967 | Sala Polivalentă |
| Handball | Men's Divizia A | CS Politehnica Iași | | Sala Polivalentă |
| Rugby | Divizia Națională de Seniori | CS Politehnica Iași (rugby) | 1964 | Agronomia Stadium |

=== Former teams ===
- FC Politehnica Iași of the Romanian football league system from 1945 to 2010;
- FC Constructorul Iași of the Romanian football league system from 1952 to 1995;
- Clubul Sportiv Armata Iași of the Republican Basketball Championship (from 1950);
- ACS Penicilina Iași of the Divizia A1 (women's volleyball) (from 1962);
- Terom Iași of the Liga Națională (women's handball) (from 1983 to 2012);
- Politehnica Național Iași of the Liga Națională (women's basketball) (until 2017).

== Transport ==
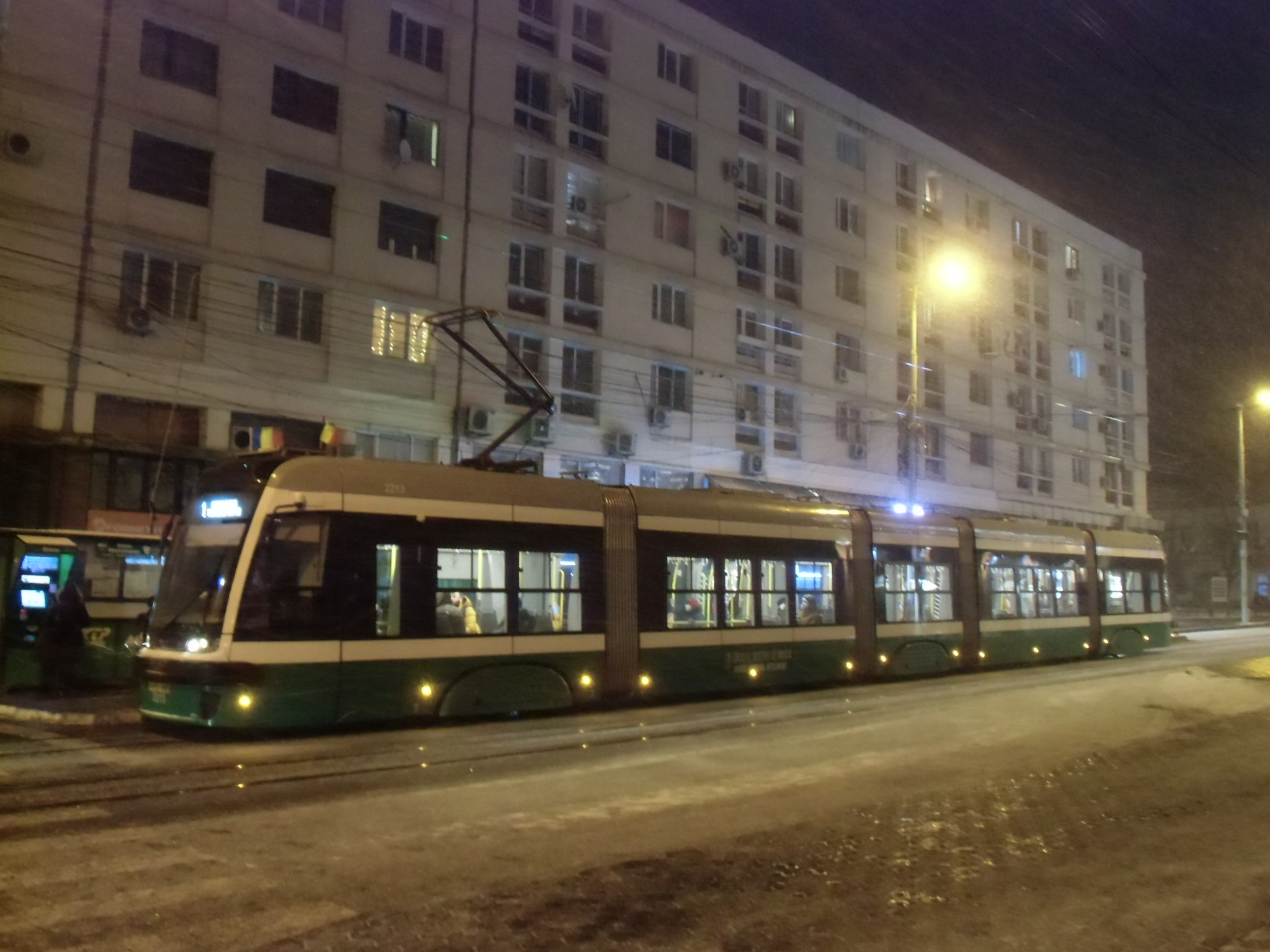
The Iași tram network is the backbone of the city's public transport

=== Public transport ===
Iași's public transportation system is served by the CTP Iași (former RATP), which operates an extensive network using 126 trams (electric trams began operating in Iași in 1900) and 150 buses. In 2014, CTP carried 50,358,000 passengers, an average of 140,000 passengers per day.

=== Air ===
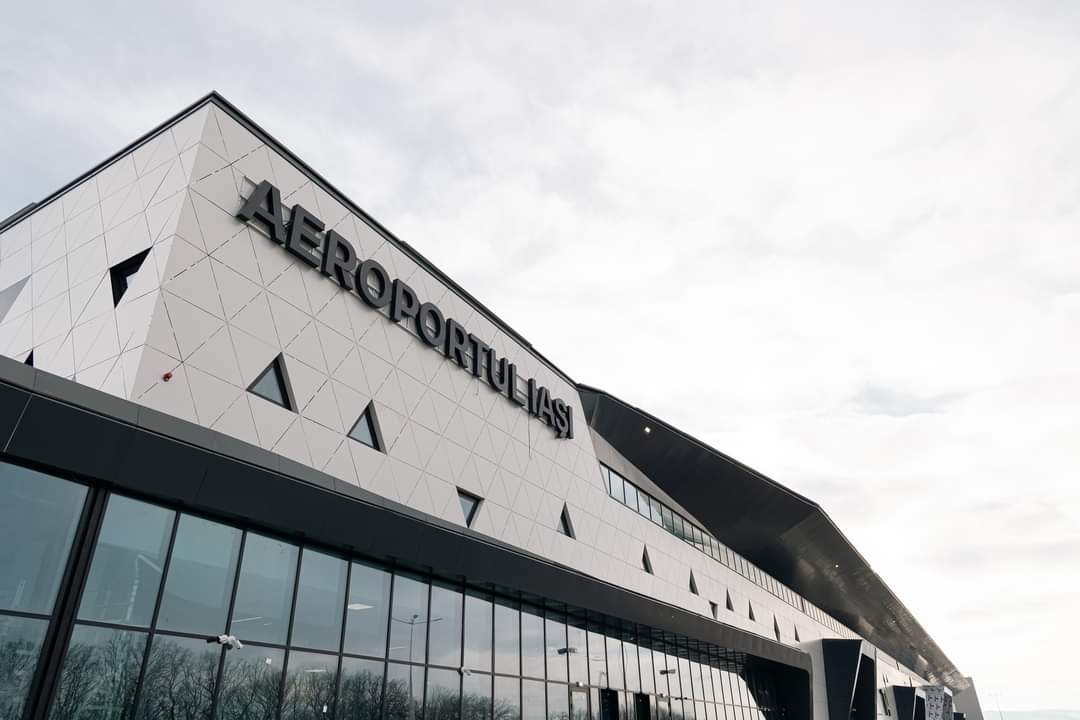
Iași Airport in 2024

Iași is served by the Iași International Airport (IAS) located 8 km (5.0 mi) east of the city centre. The airport is the 3rd busiest in Romania and offers direct domestic, European, and Middle Eastern scheduled or charter connections. After extensive modernisation works, the number of connections and traffic volumes have seen a significant increase since 2015.

=== Rail ===
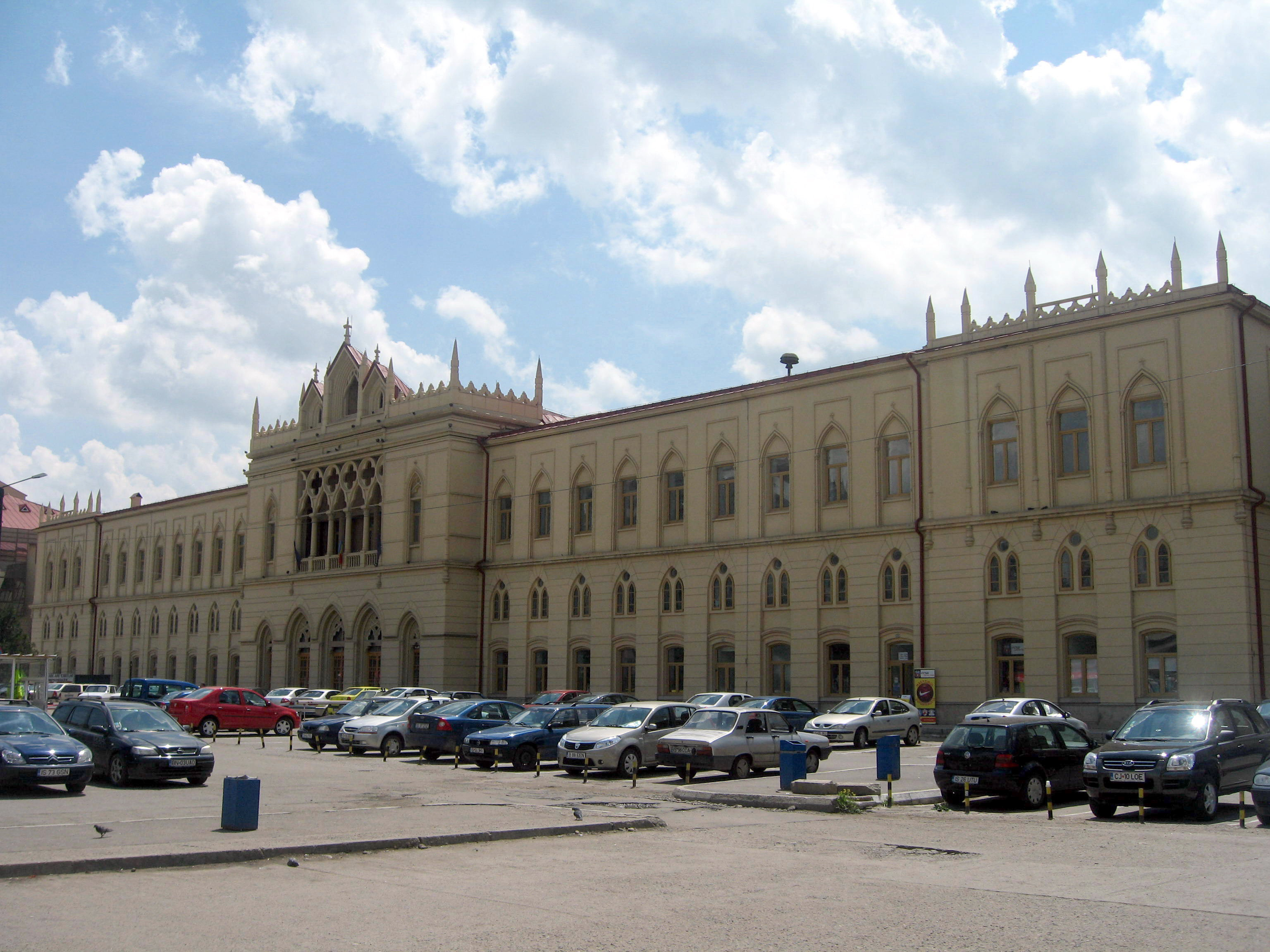
Iași Grand Station

Iași-Pașcani railway was opened on 1 June [O.S. 20 May] 1870, Iași-Ungheni on 1 August 1874 and Iași-Chișinău railway was opened on 1 June 1875 by the Russian Empire in preparation for the Russo-Turkish War (1877–1878).

Nowadays, three railway stations, Grand Railway Station, Nicolina International railway station and Socola railway station serve the city and are operated by Romanian Railways (CFR). Moldovan railway also serves these stations for travel into Moldova.

The Grand Railway Station, located about 1 km (0.6 mi) from the city centre, provides direct rail connections to all the major Romanian cities and to Chișinău, Moldova. The rail stations are very well connected to all the parts of the city by the trams and buses of the local public transport companies.

=== Road ===
Iași is connected by European routes E583/E85 with Bucharest through a four lane road, by European route E58 with Central Europe and Chișinău in Moldova, and by DN National Roads with all major cities of Romania. The East-West Motorway (A8) (also known as The Union Motorway), in various stages of construction and planning, which starts at the Romanian border with Moldova in Ungheni, will connect the city to the A7 Moldavia Motorway in Pașcani, and the A3 Transylvania Motorway near Târgu Mureș.

The Iași Coach Station is used by several private transport companies to provide coach connections from Iași to a large number of locations from all over the country.

== Health care ==
Iași is home to 14 public hospitals, including the Saint Spiridon Hospital, the second largest and one of the oldest in Romania (1755), St. Maria Clinic Children's Hospital (one of the largest children's hospitals in the country), Institute of Cardiovascular Diseases, Regional Oncology Institute, and Socola Psychiatric Institute (1905 – first psychiatric hospital in Romania). The public system is complemented by numerous private clinics.

In December 2021, the Ministry of Health signed the contract for the design of a new hospital that will serve the entire North-East region. The total investment in the construction of the Iași Regional Emergency Hospital (Romanian: Spitalul Regional de Urgență (SRU) Iași), with a completion date of 2027, is estimated at over 500 million euros.

=== Air pollution concerns ===
In 2014, the European Commission started environmental law infringement procedures against Romania, citing Bucharest, Iași, and Brașov cases as examples. In 2015, while the atmospheric particulate matter has repeatedly reached and exceeded legal thresholds for PM_{10}, Iași came to be regarded as the city with the second worst air quality in Romania, after Bucharest. Pollution from vehicular traffic, construction works, and a lack of green spaces (the city only has about 11 m^{2} (118 sq ft) of public green spaces per capita) make up some of the reasons behind these problems.

== Monuments and history ==
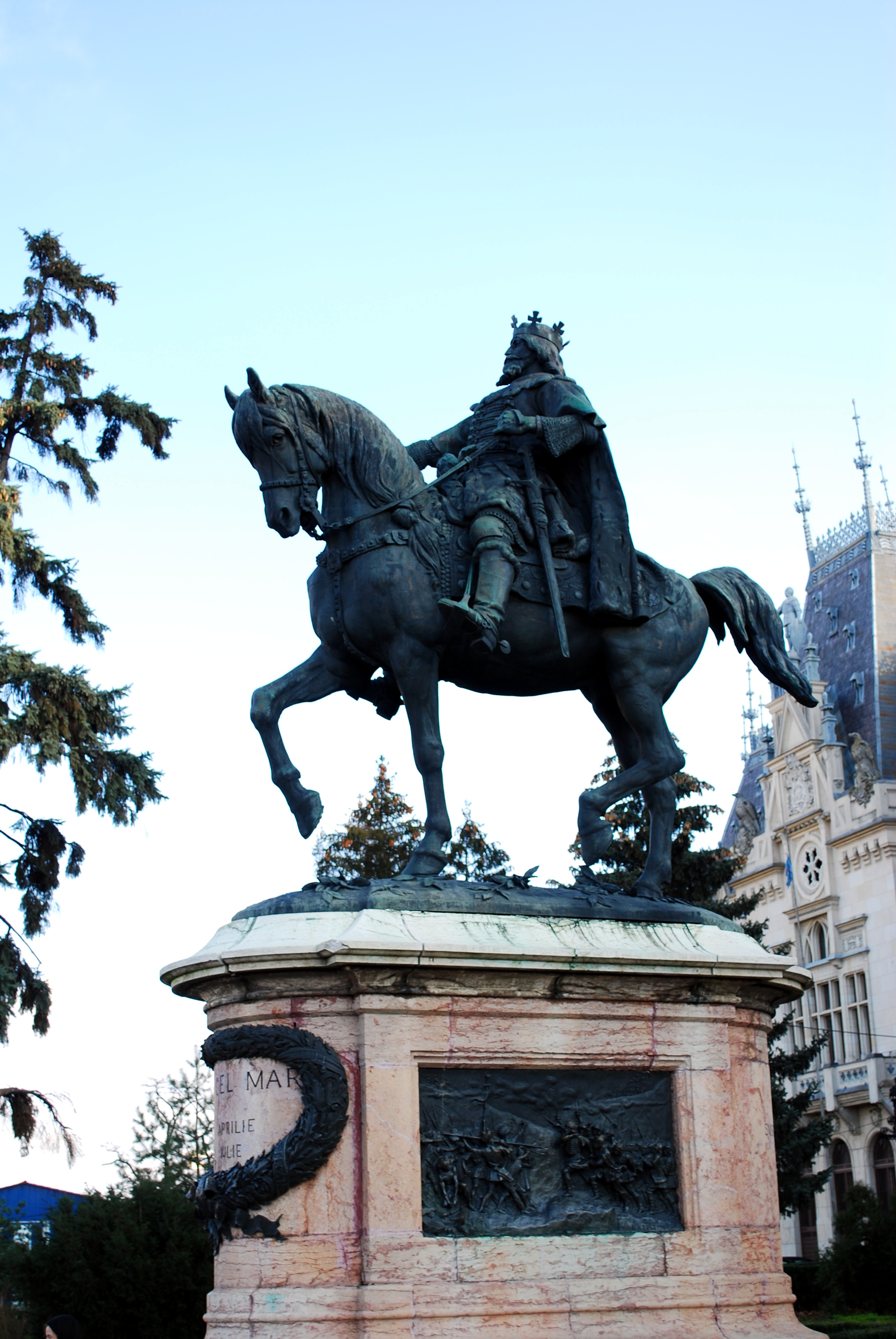
Stephen the Great

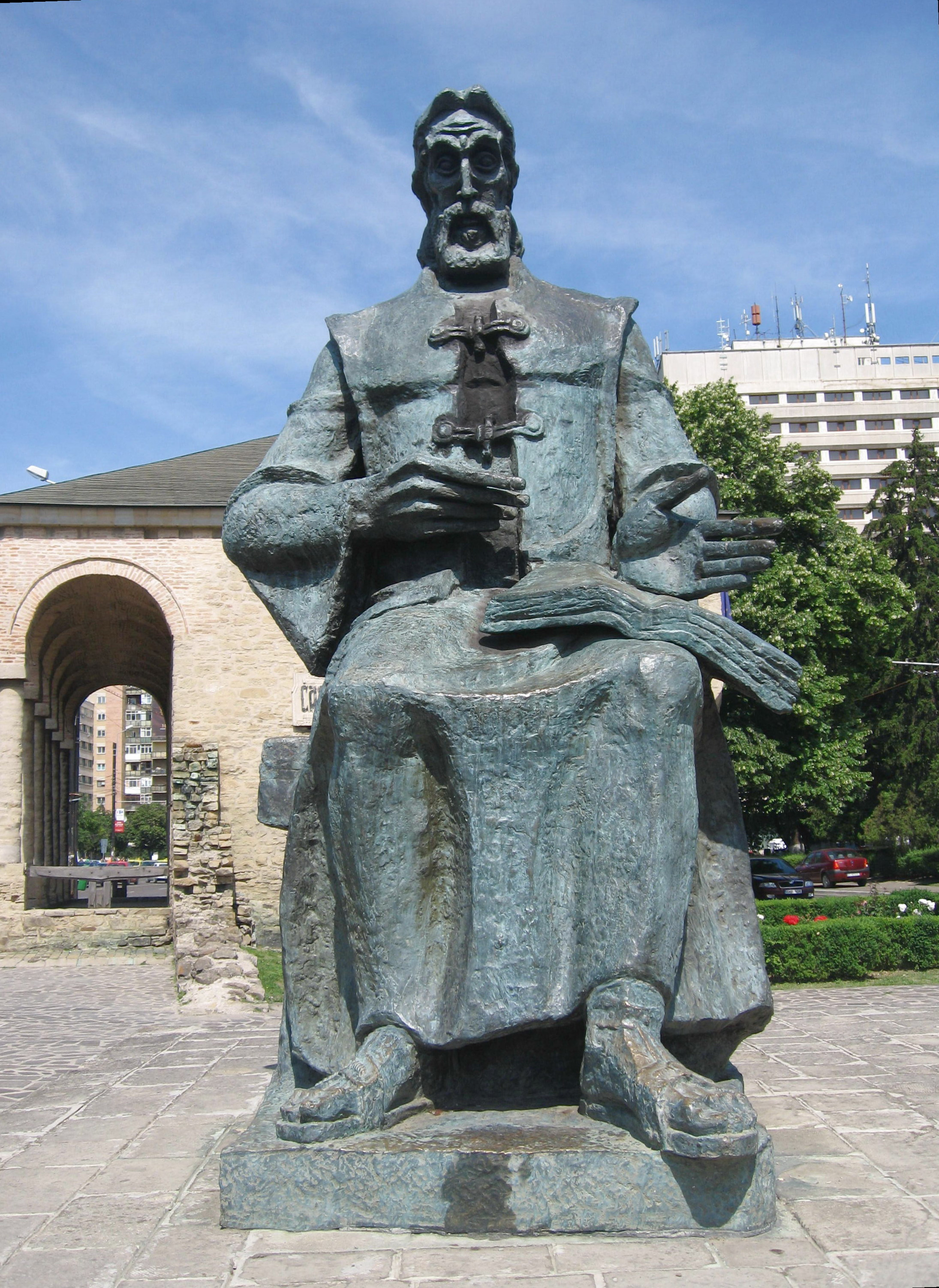
Dosoftei

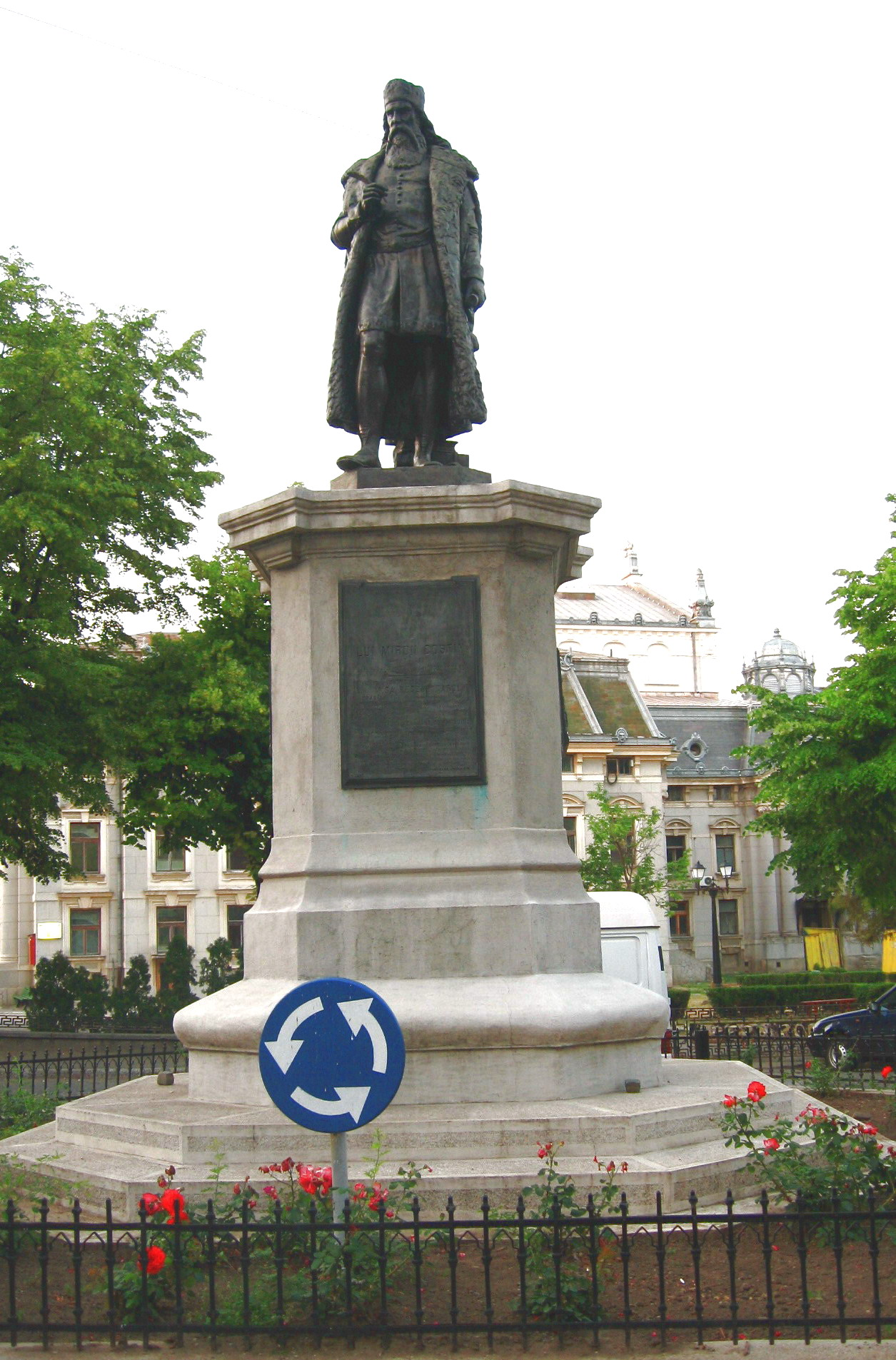
Miron Costin

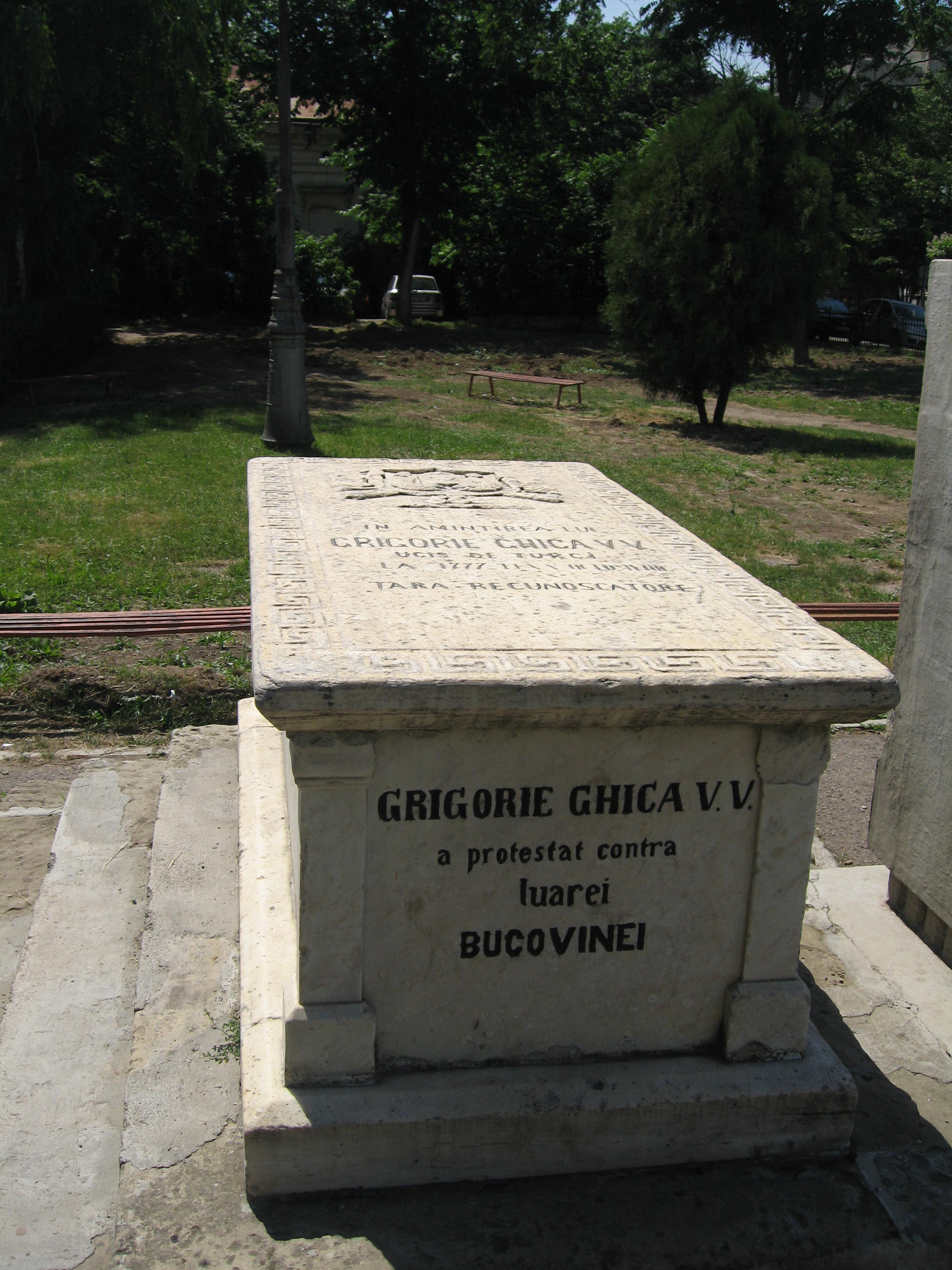
Grigore III Ghica Monument

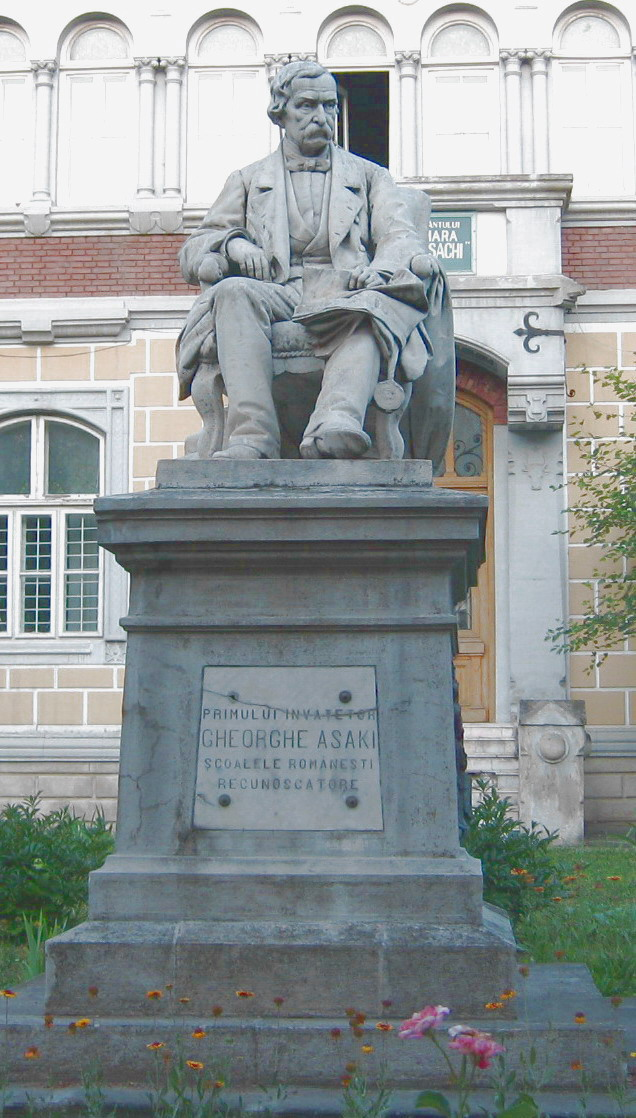
Gheorghe Asachi

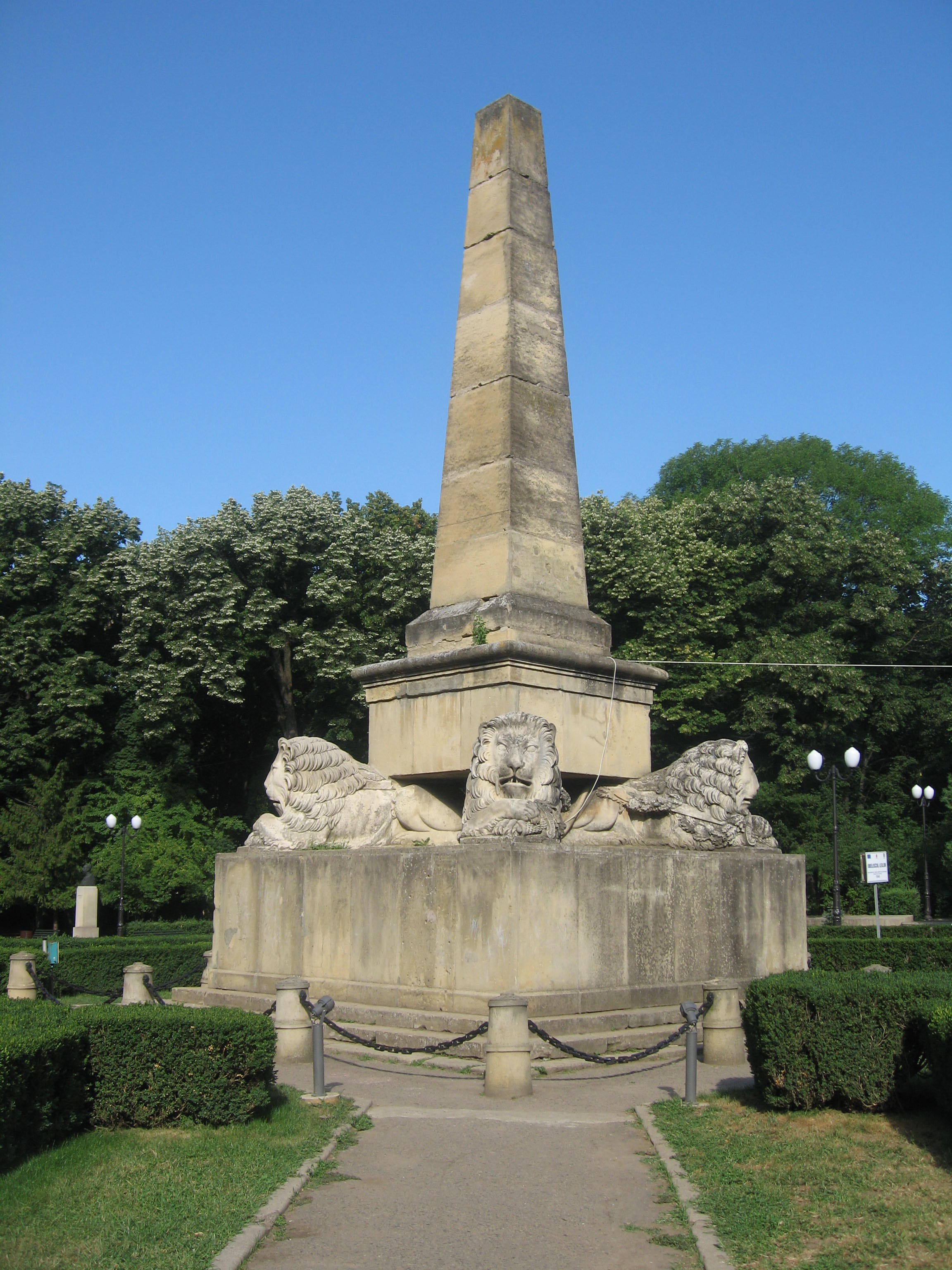
The Obelisk of Lions

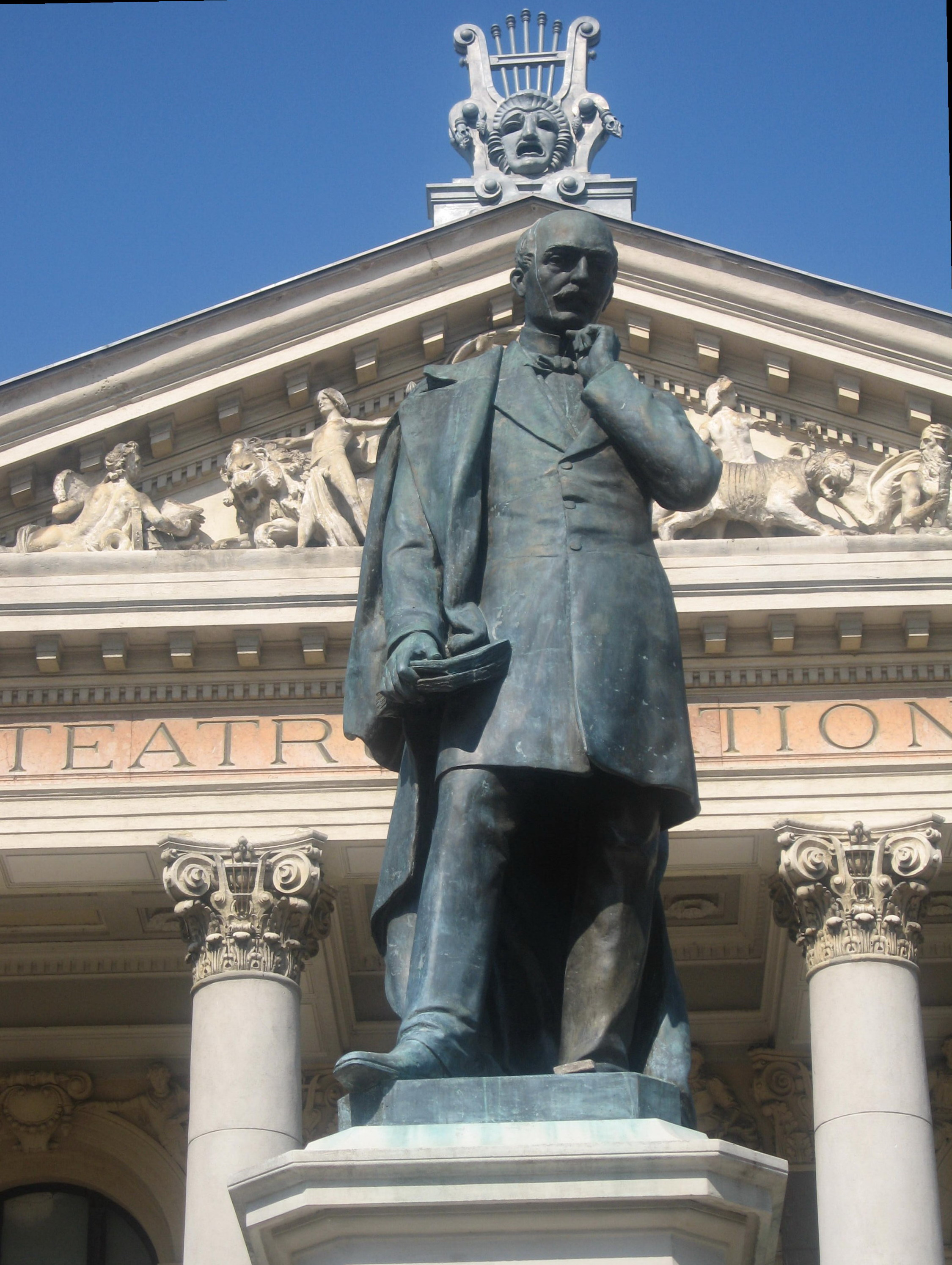
Vasile Alecsandri

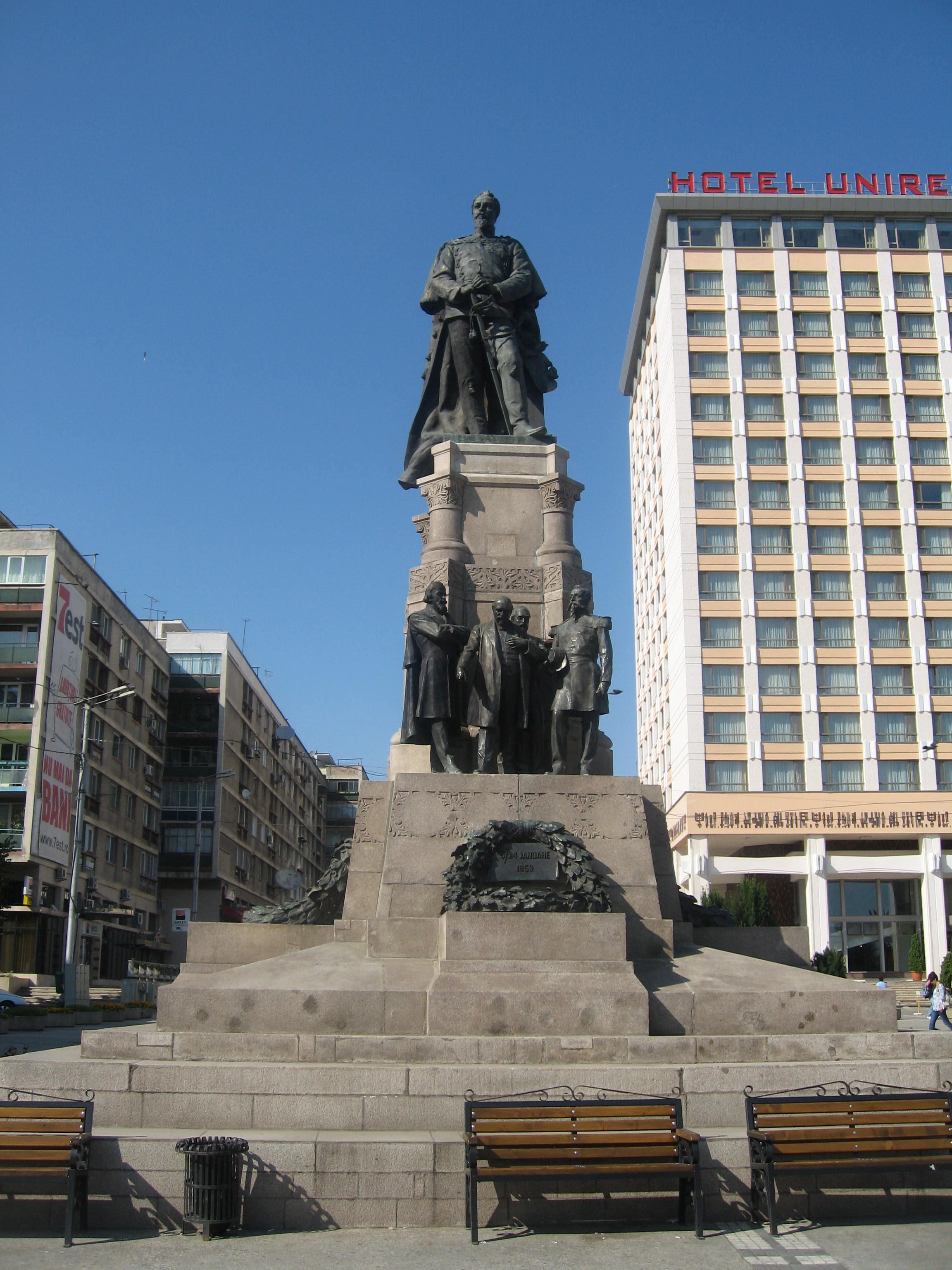
Alexandru Ioan Cuza

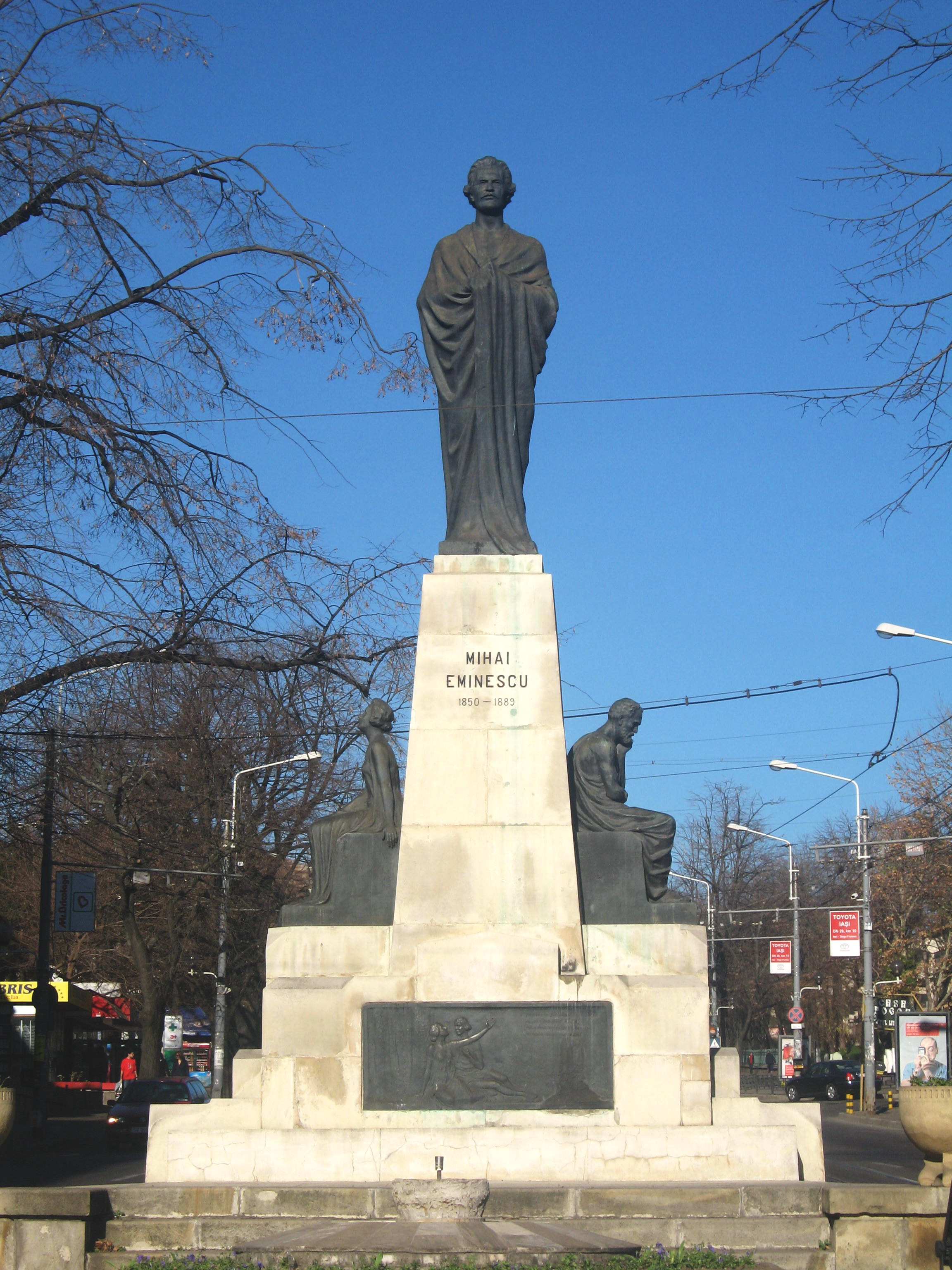
Mihai Eminescu Monument

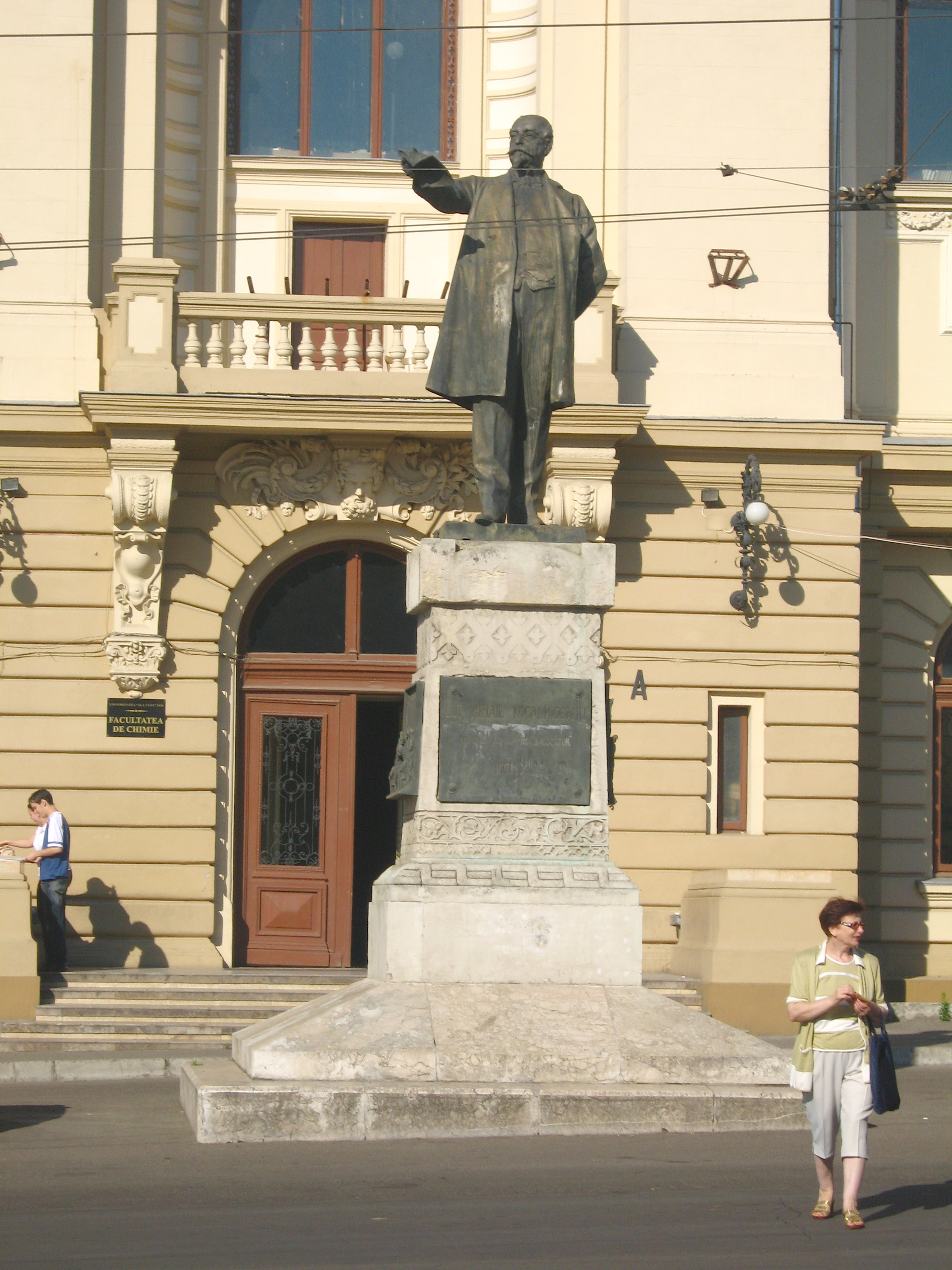
Mihail Kogălniceanu

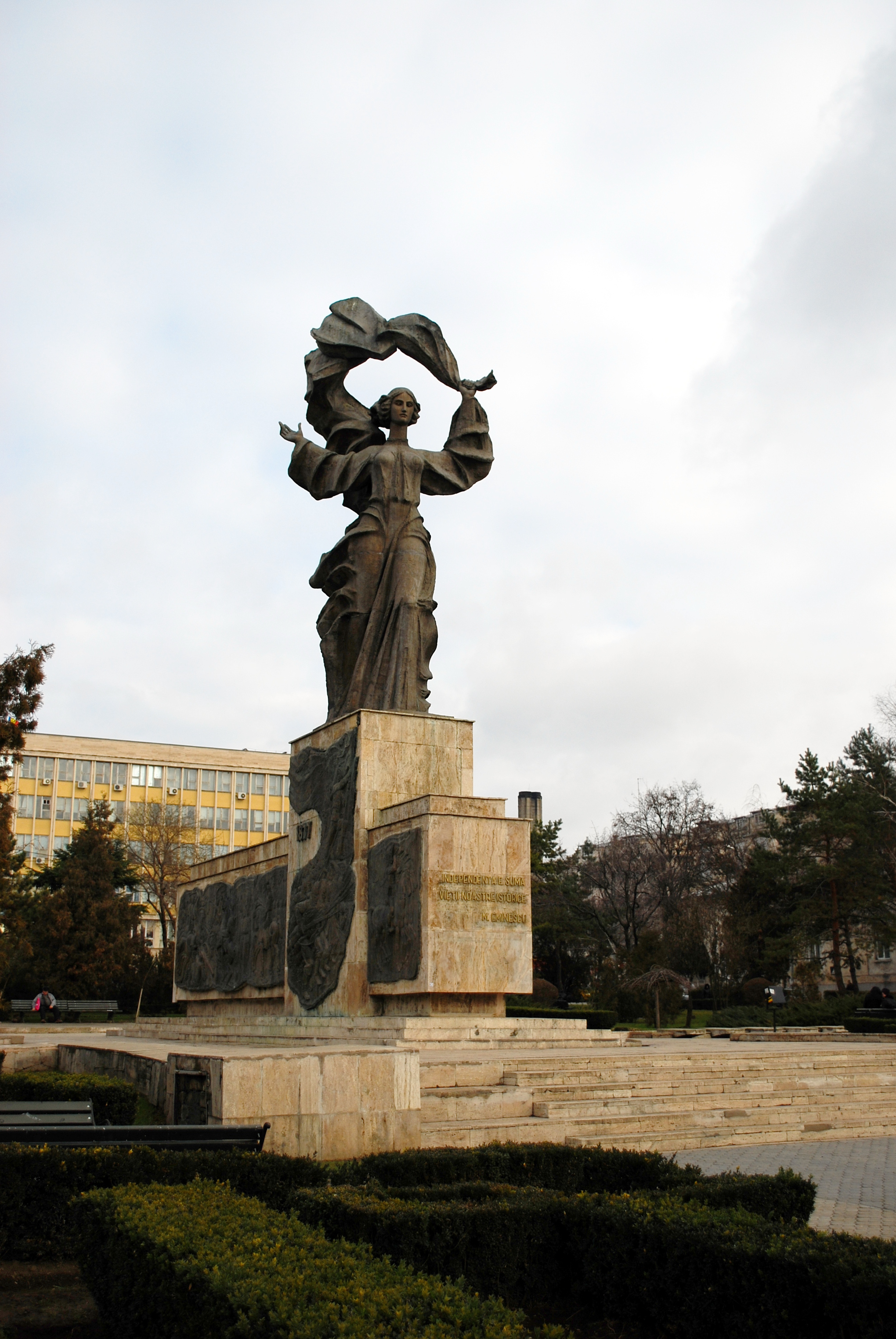
Independence Monument

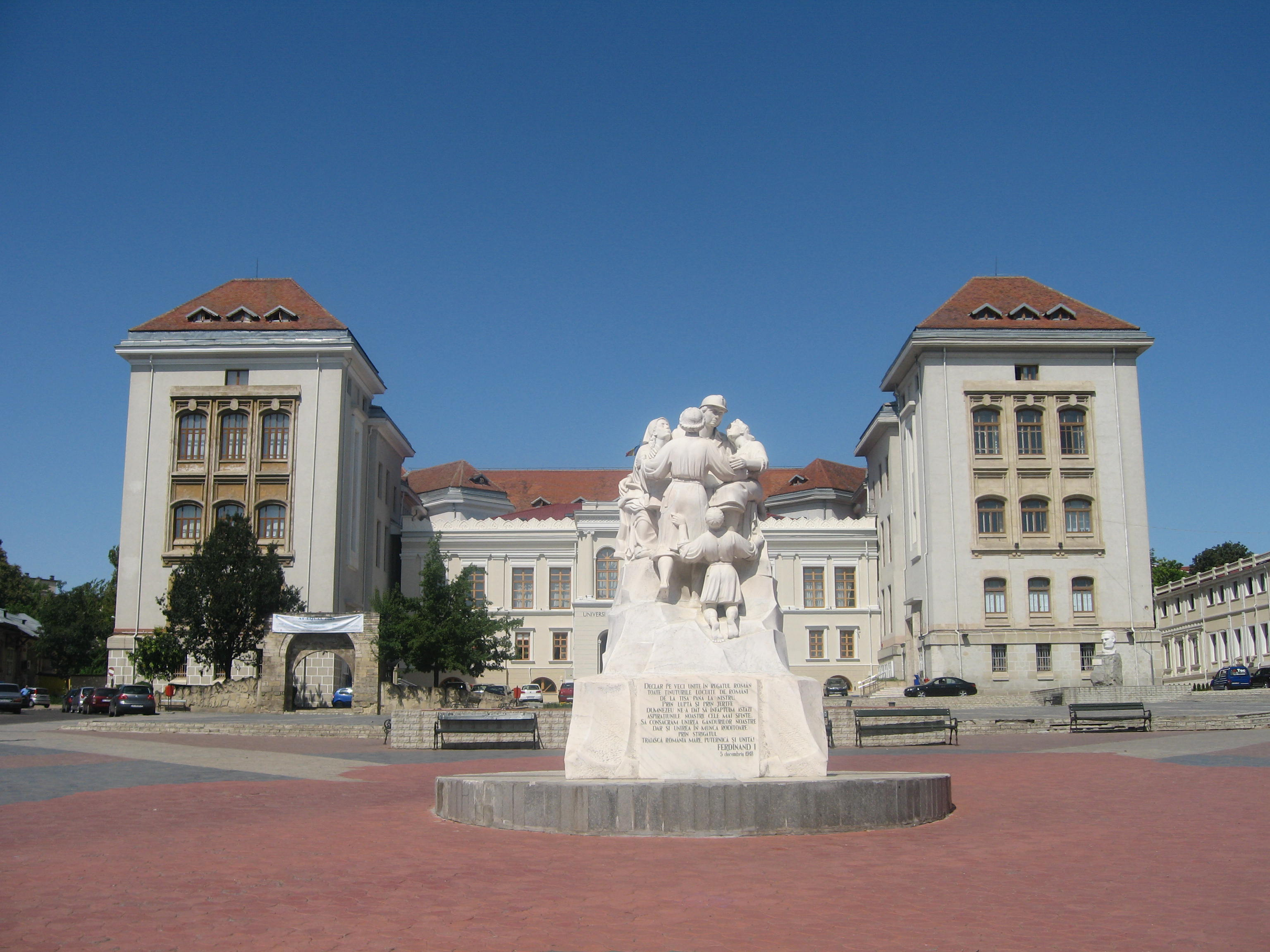
Union Monument

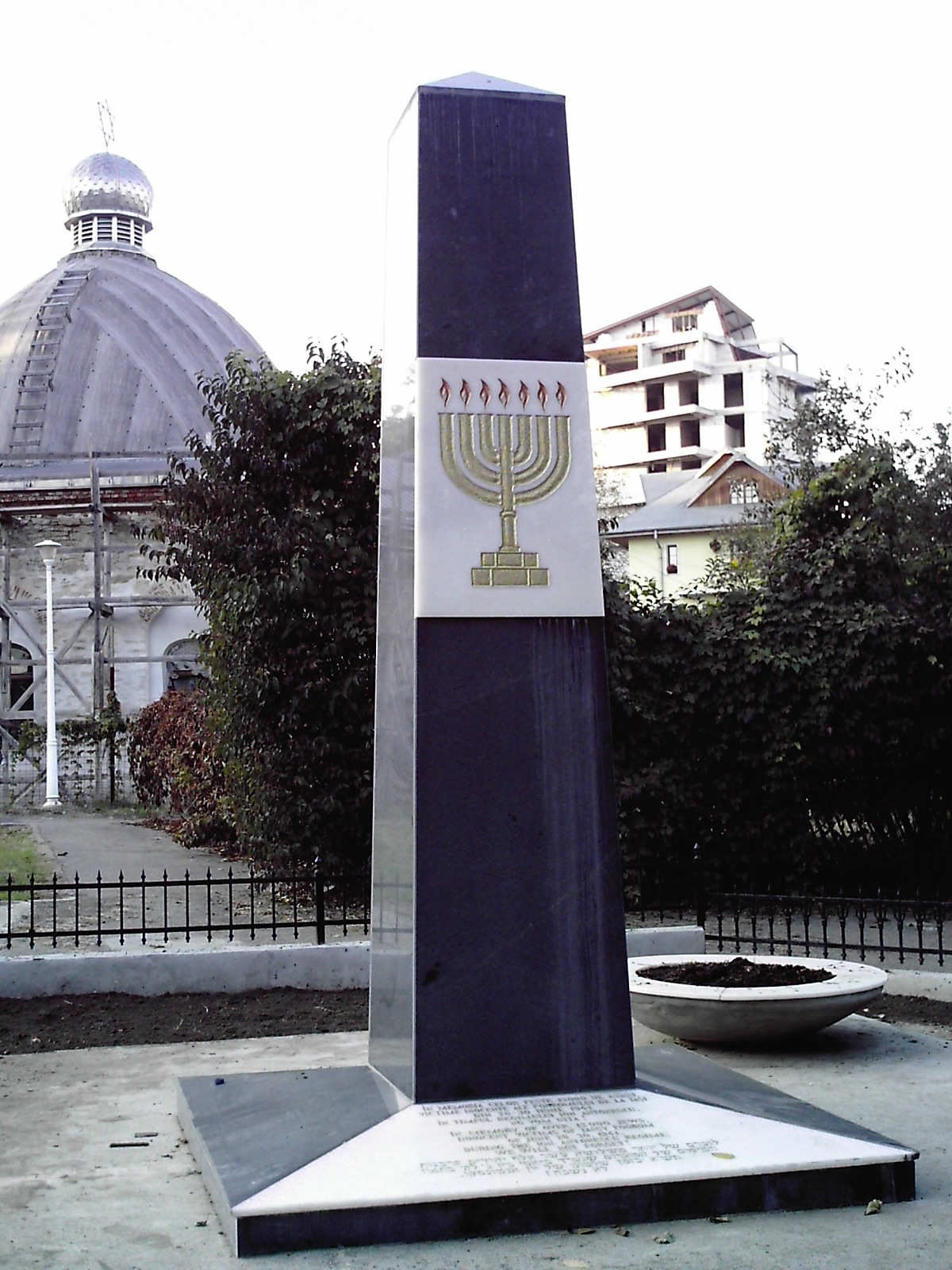
Victims of Iași Pogrom Monument

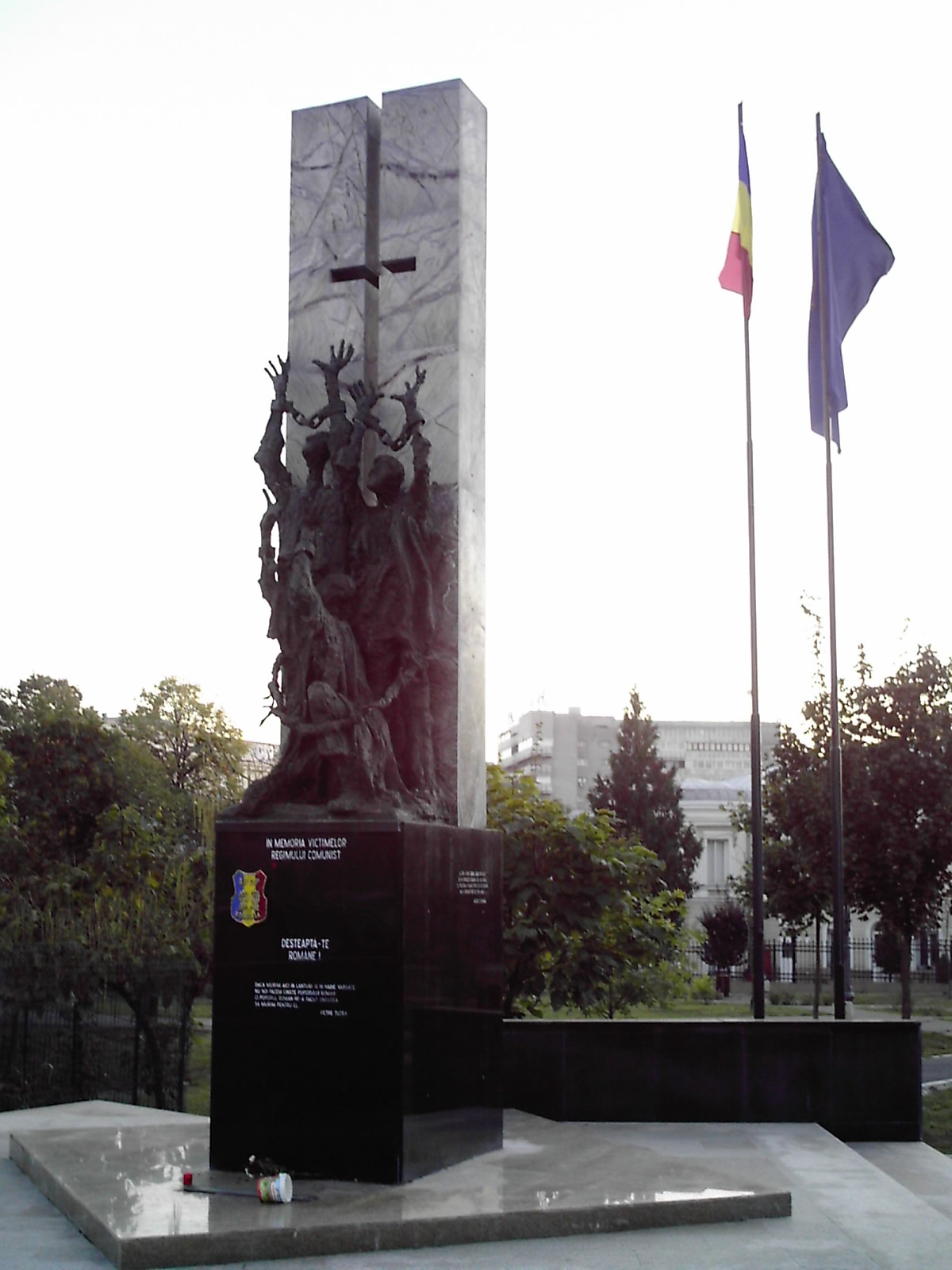
Victims of Communism Memorial

== Twin towns/sister cities ==
Iași is twinned with:

| Assiut, Egypt (1995); Athens, Georgia, United States (2001); Chernivtsi, Ukraine (2012); Chișinău, Moldova (2008); Eindhoven, Netherlands (2011); Filacciano, Italy (1999); Forano, Italy (1999); Huế, Vietnam (2023); Ilioupolis, Greece (2007) | Irbid, Jordan (2000); Isfahan, Iran (1999); Jericho, Palestine (2003); Kozani, Greece (1928); Monterrey, Mexico (2002); Morlupo, Italy (1999); Nazzano, Italy (1999); Netanya, Israel | Padua, Italy (1995); Peristeri, Greece (2002); Poitiers, France (1969); Sant'Oreste, Italy (1999); Torrita Tiberina, Italy (1999); Veliko Turnovo, Bulgaria (1998); Villeneuve d'Ascq, France (2003); Xi'an, China (1993) |

== Consulates in Iași ==
- Republic of Moldova – Consulate-General

Honorary Consulates:

- France
- Hungary
- Italy
- Pakistan
- Turkey

== References and sources ==
Sources

- National Institute of Statistics: http://www.insse.ro
