= Lions' Obelisk =

Coordinates: 47°10′43″N 27°34′01″E

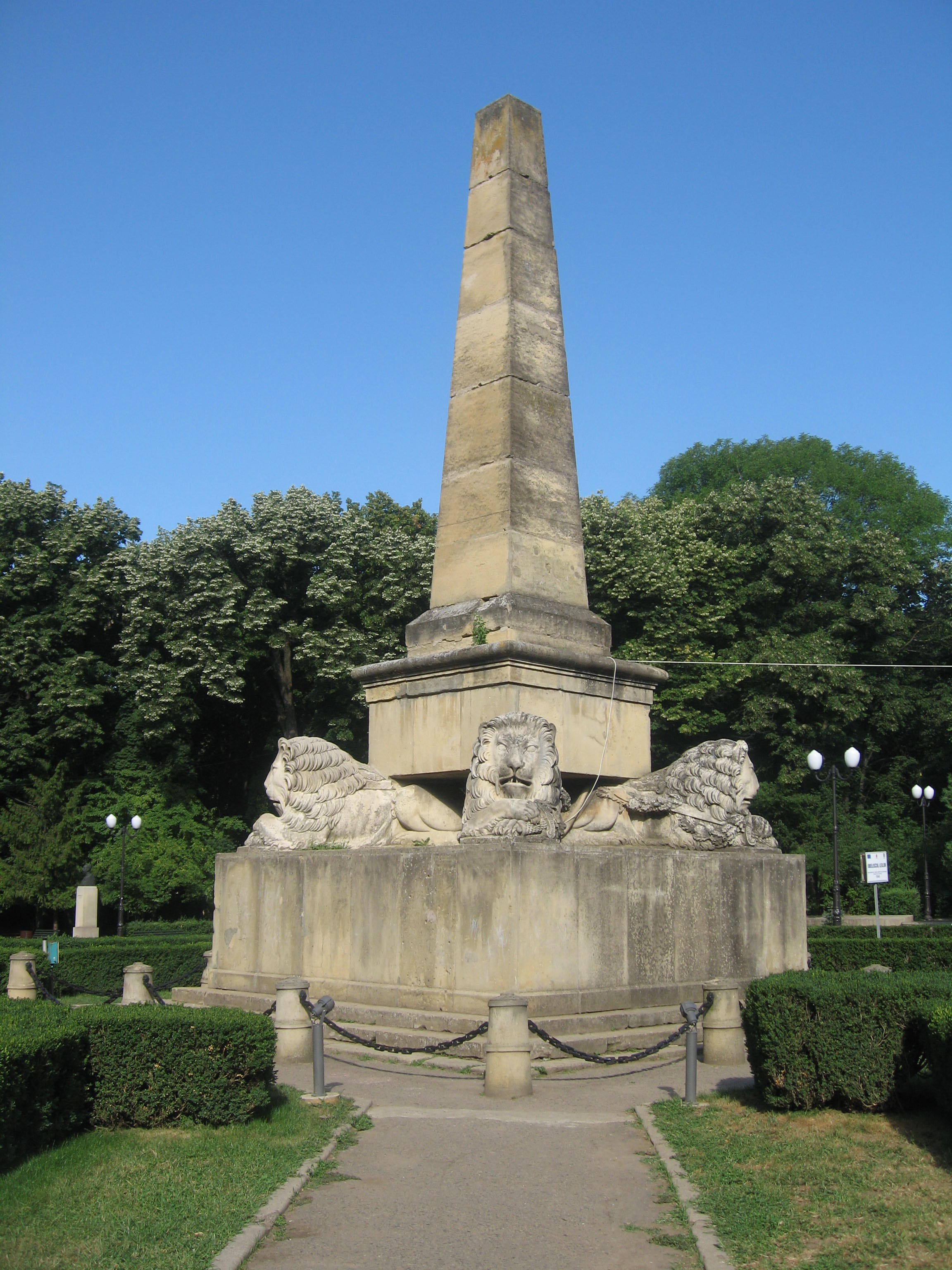
The Lions' Obelisk, Iași

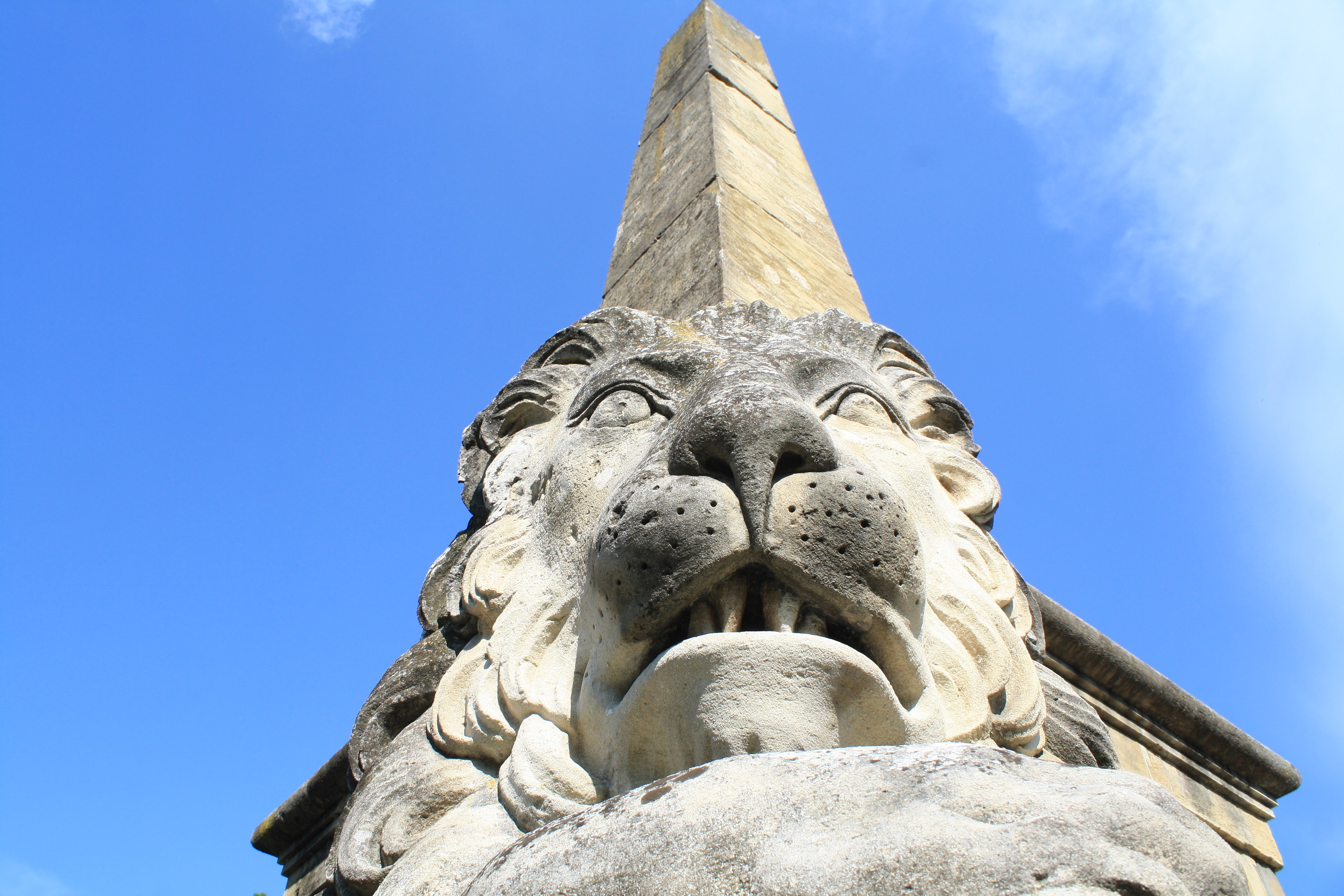
The Lions' Obelisk, Iași (detail)

The Lions' Obelisk, also known as the Obelisk of Lions (Romanian: Obeliscul cu lei) is a historical monument in Copou Park, Iași, Romania.

The construction was built between 1834 and 1841 and is dedicated to the Law of Organic Rules.

Considered one of the country's oldest public monuments, the 13.5 m (44 ft) tall edifice was finalized under the supervision of Gheorghe Asachi and is situated next to Eminescu's Linden Tree.

== Images ==
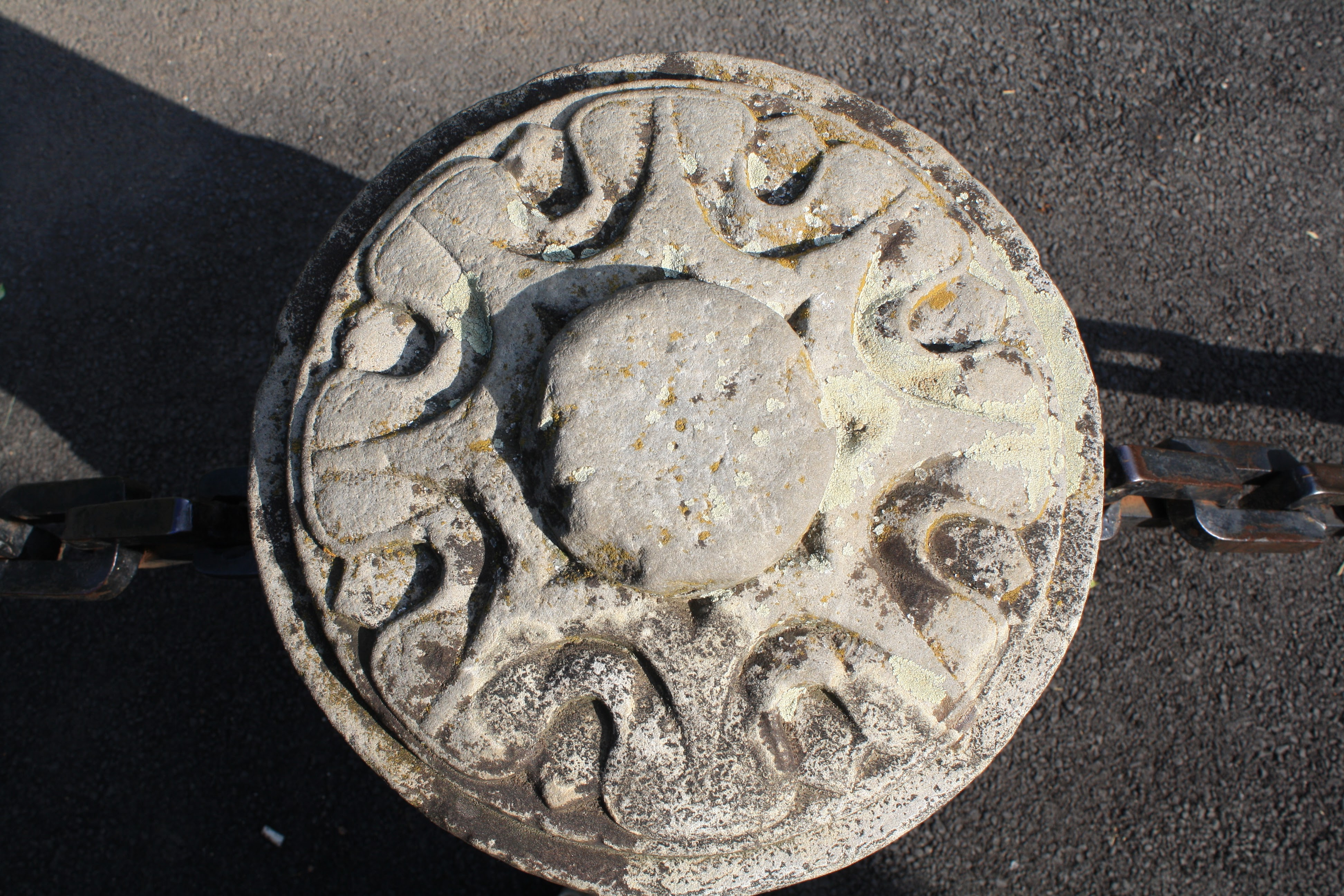

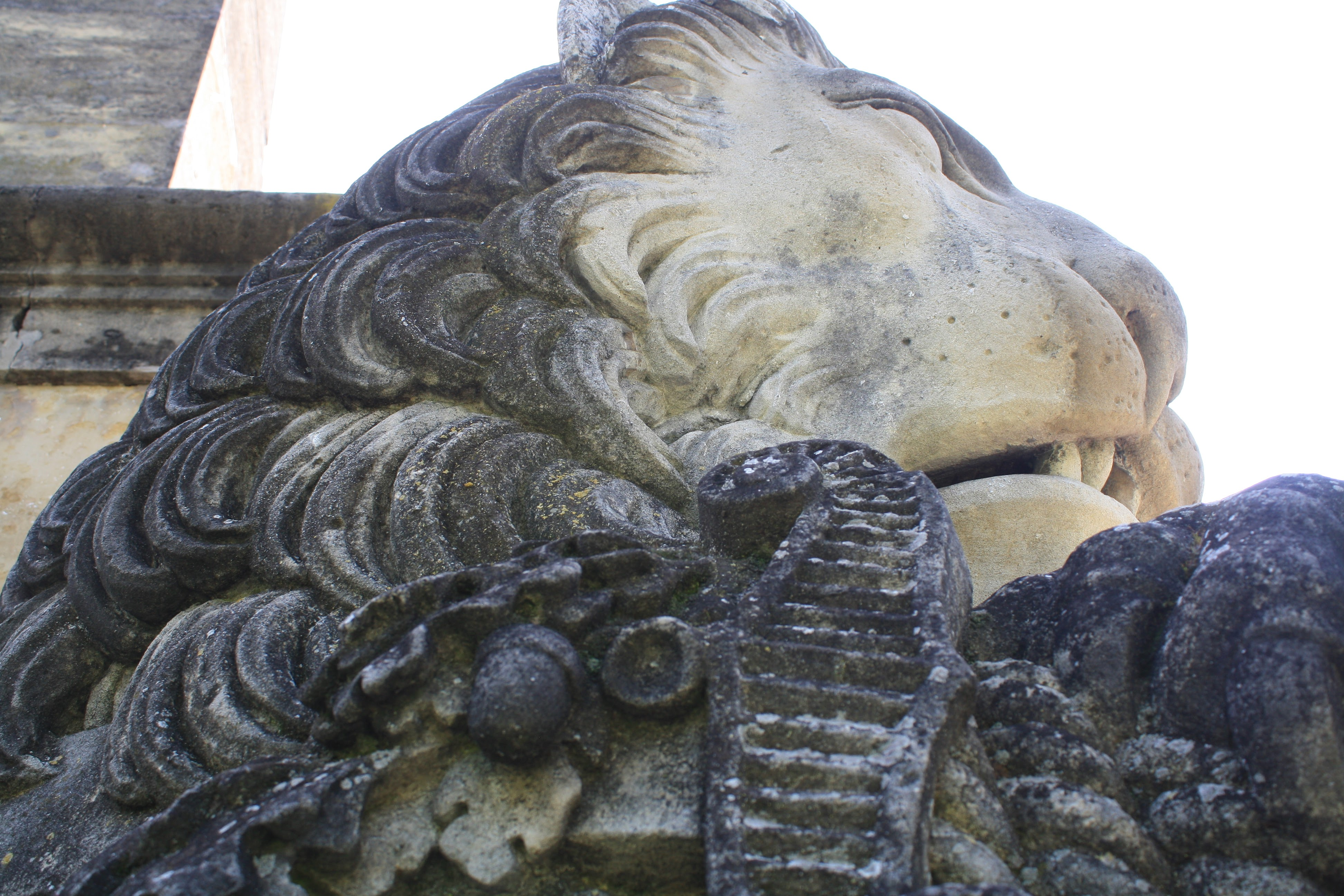

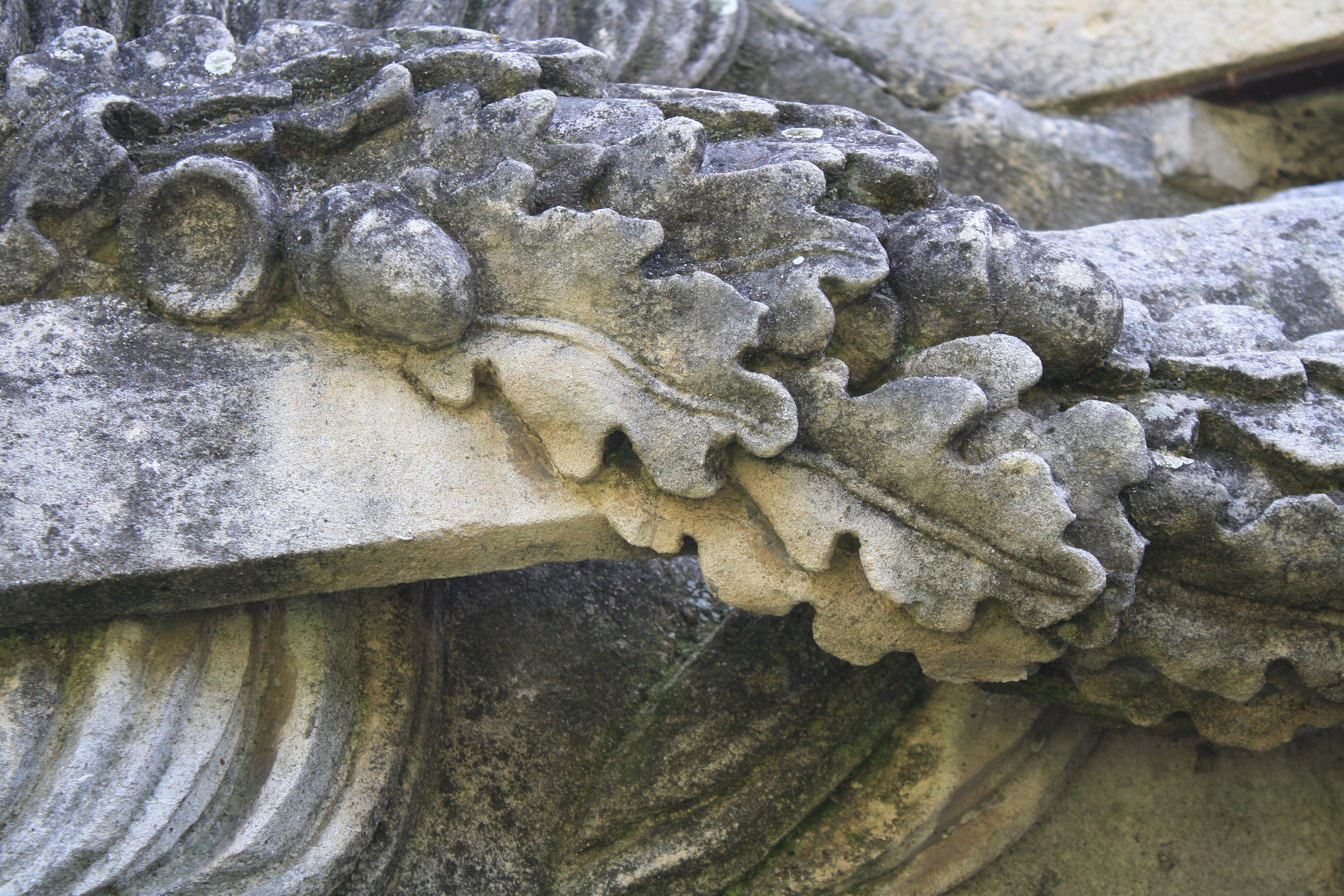

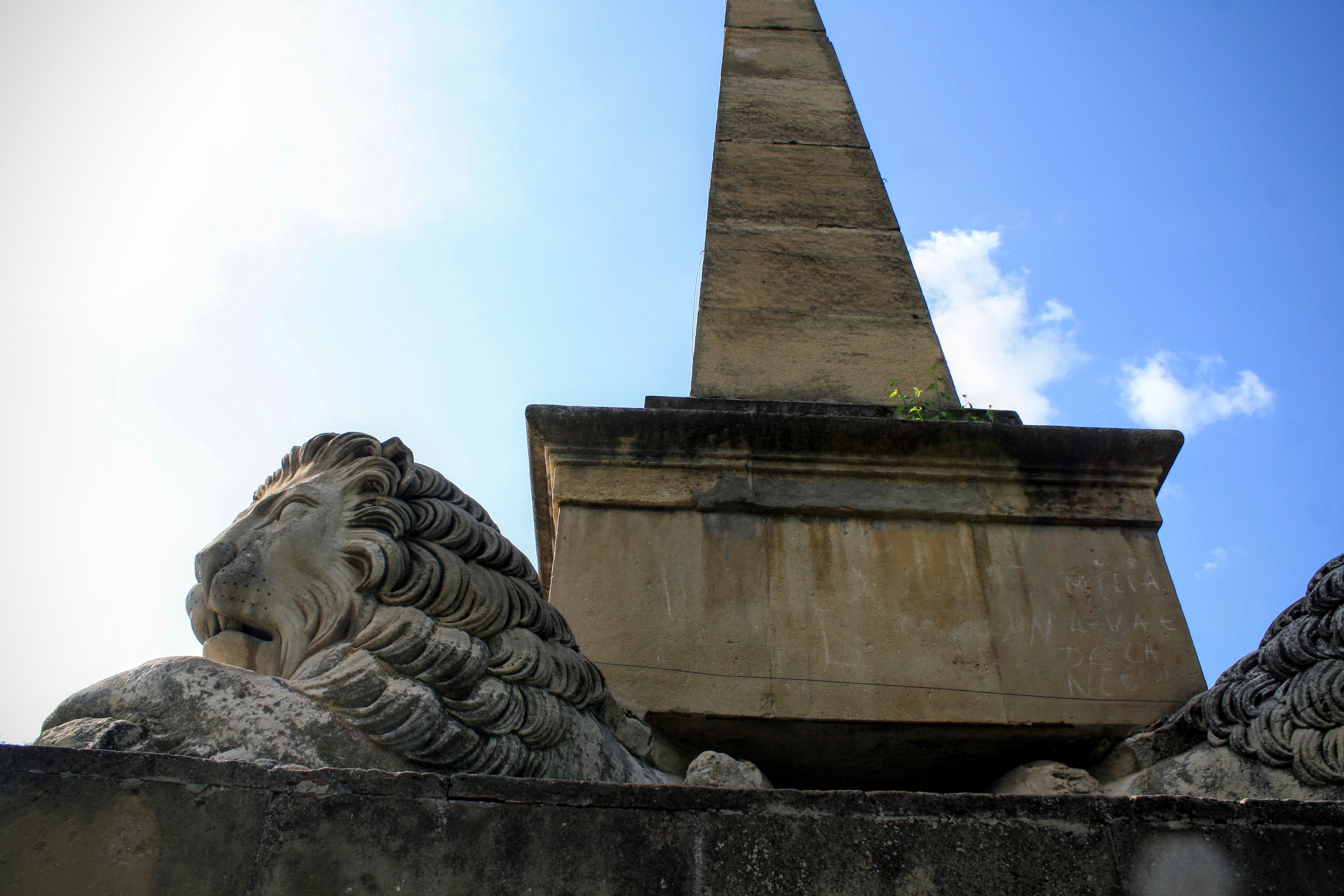

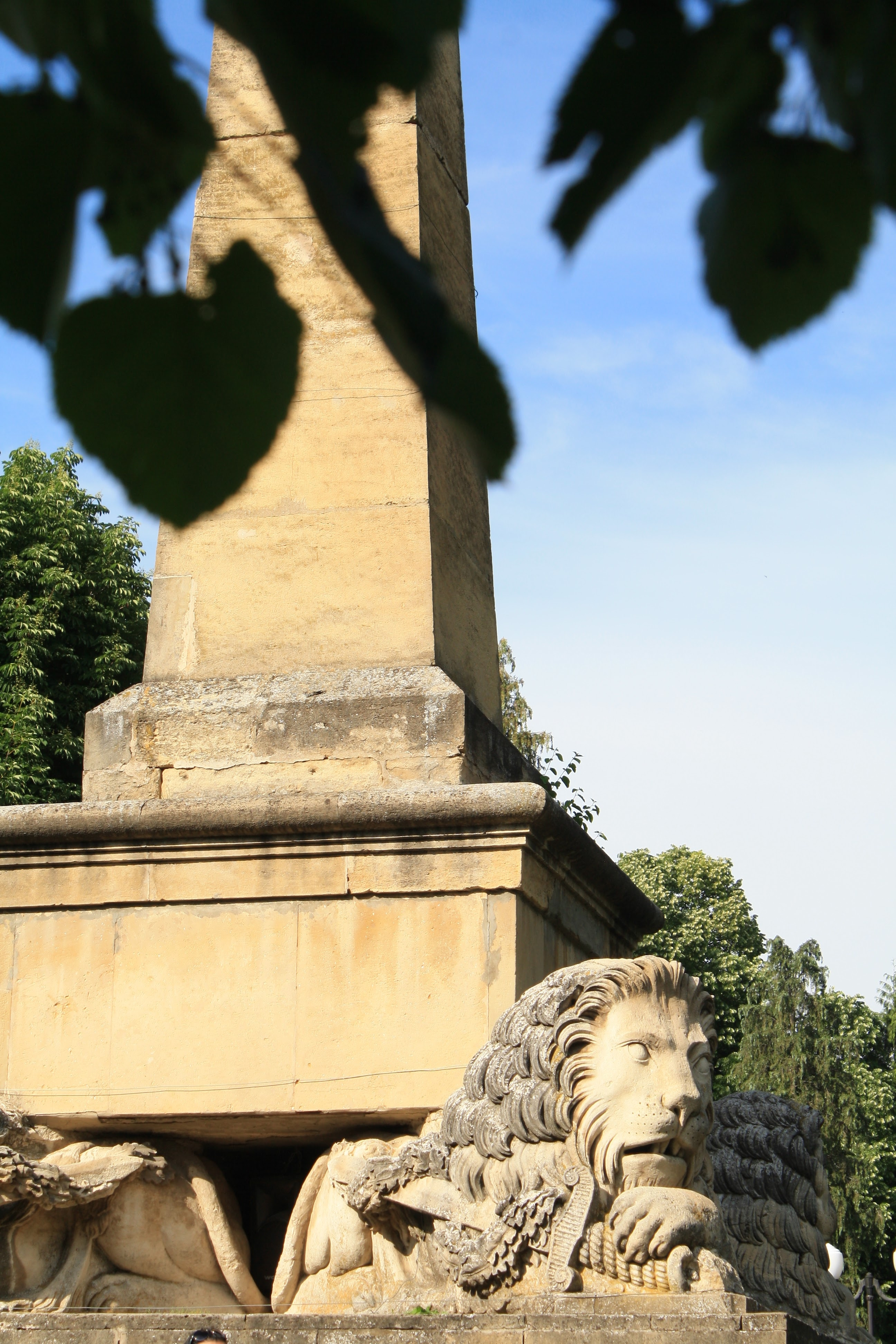

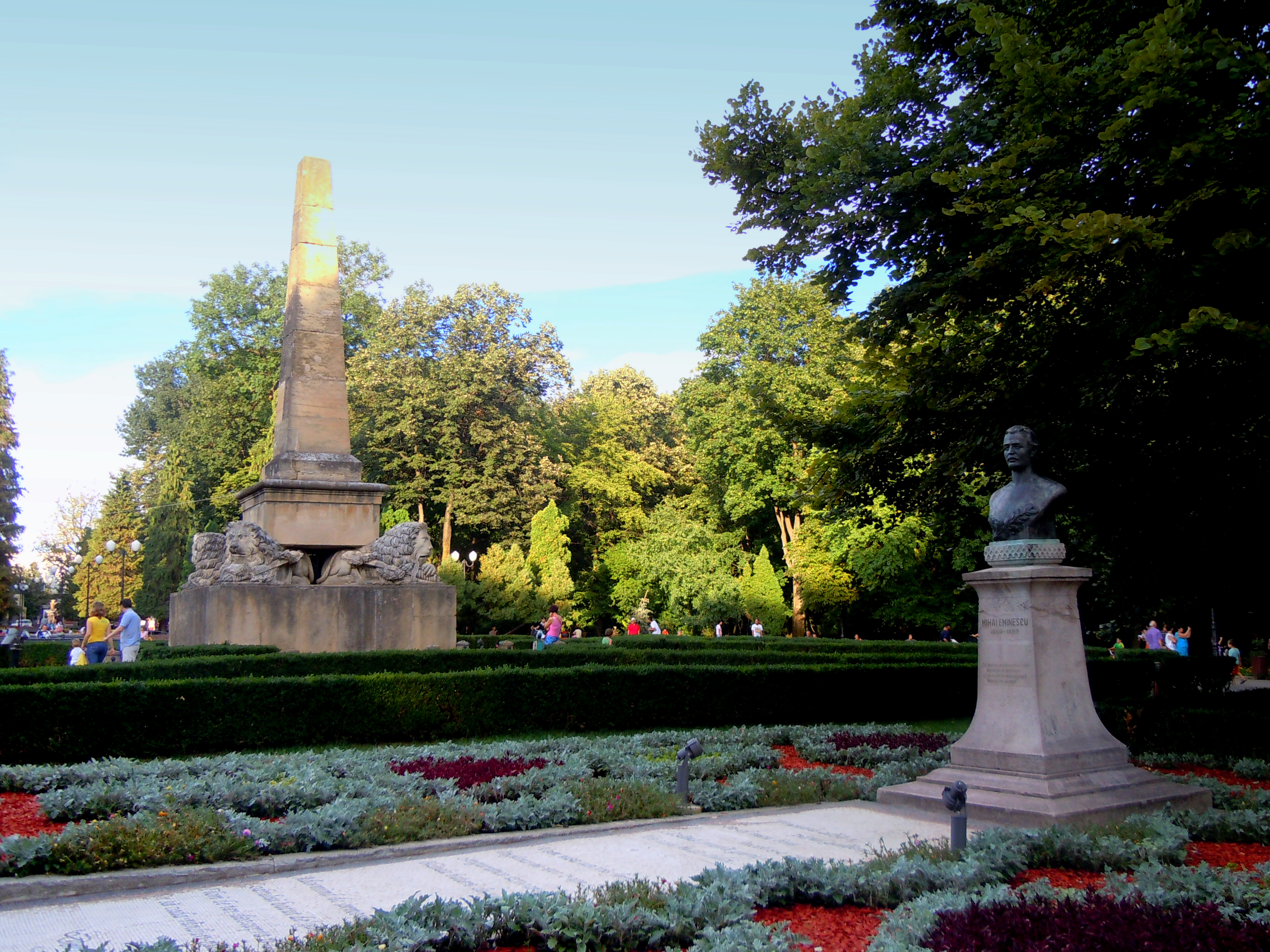

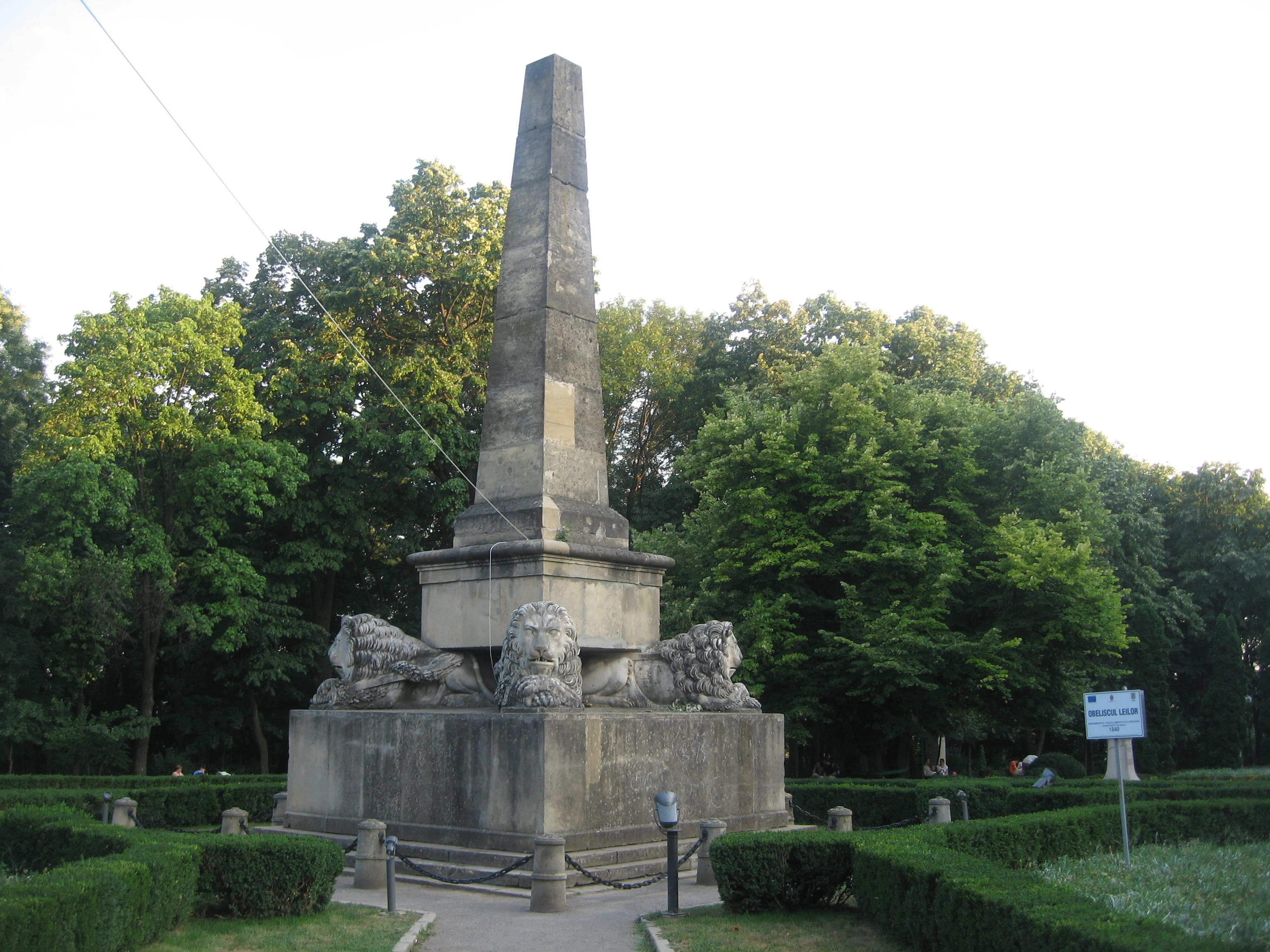

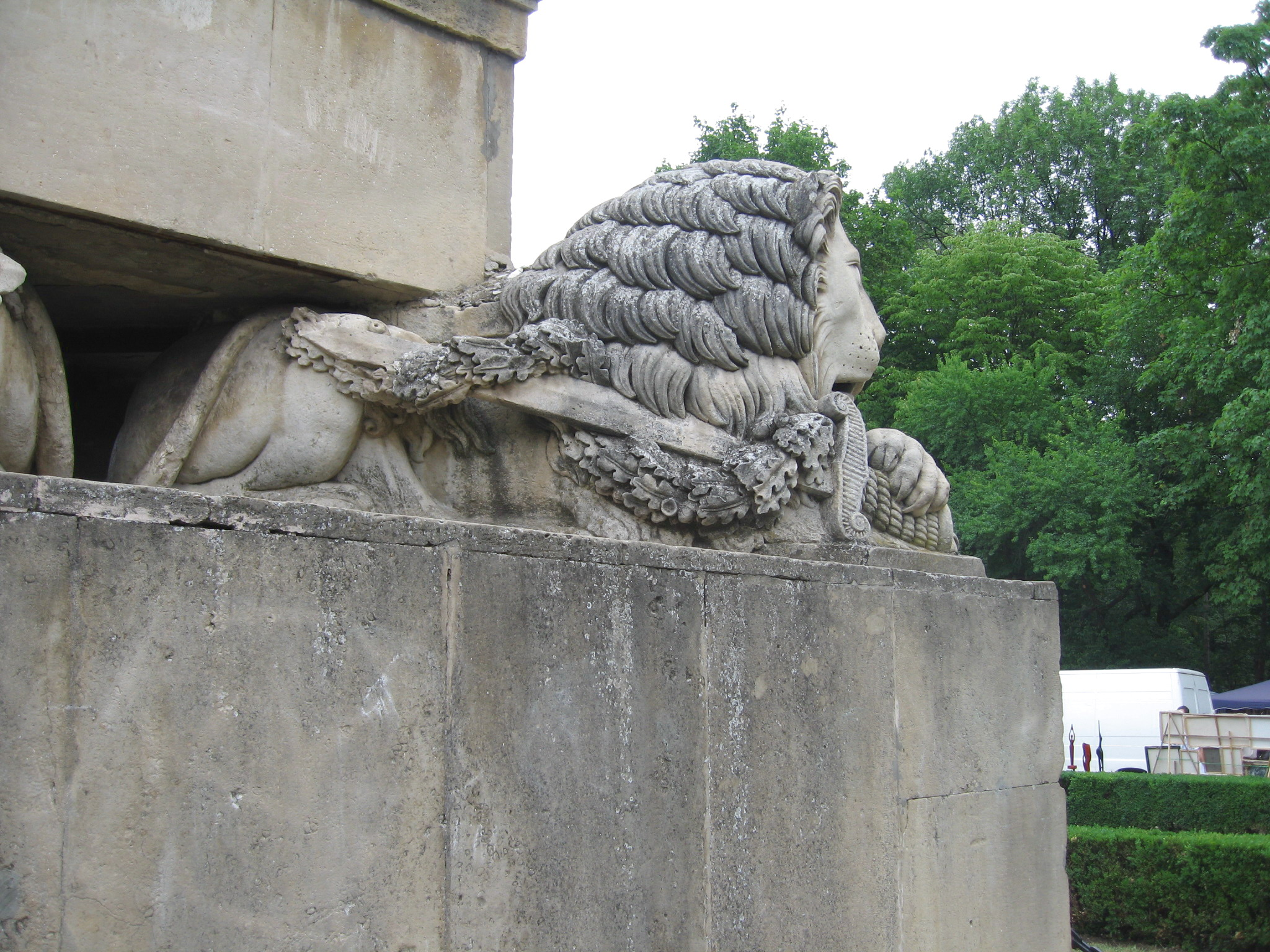

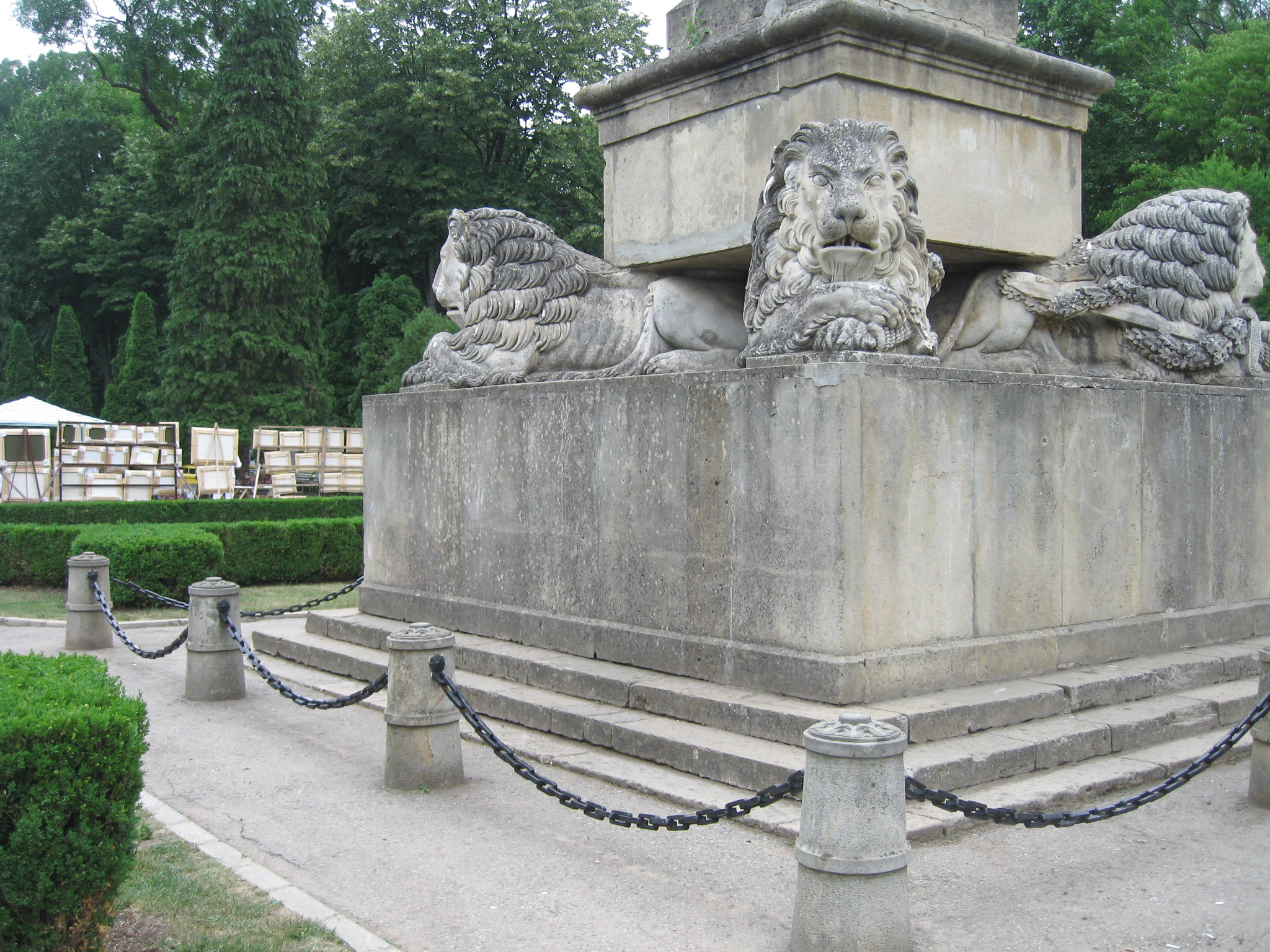
