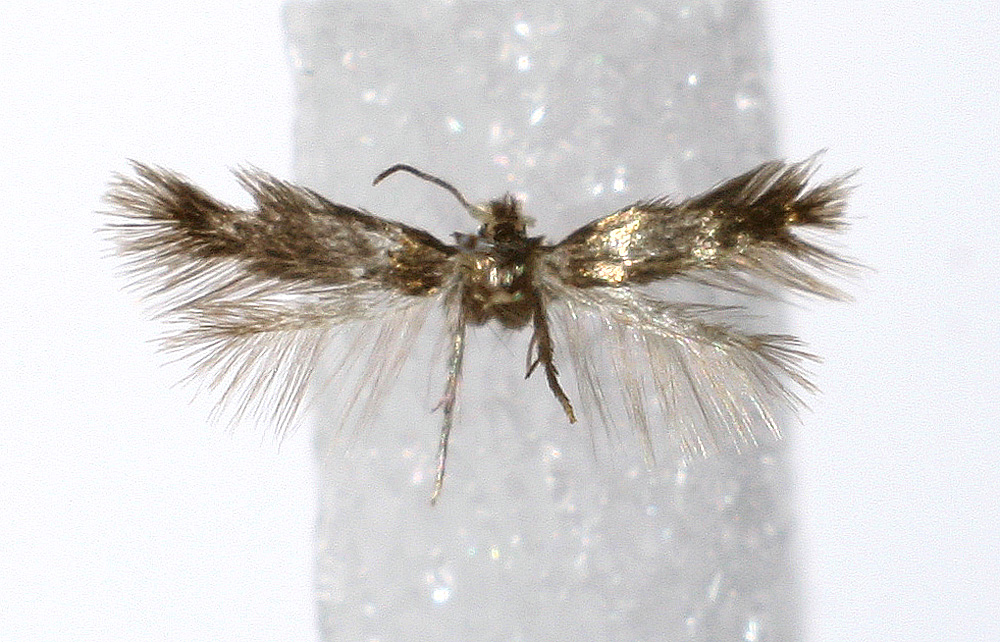

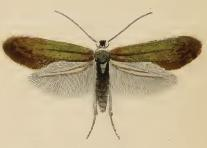

Scientific classification
- Kingdom: Animalia
- Phylum: Arthropoda
- Class: Insecta
- Order: Lepidoptera
- Family: Nepticulidae
- Genus: Stigmella
- Species: S. tiliae

Binomial name
- Stigmella tiliae (Frey, 1856)

Synonyms
- Nepticula tiliae Frey, 1856

= Stigmella tiliae =

Species of moth

Stigmella tiliae is a moth of the family Nepticulidae. It is found in all of Europe, except the Balkan Peninsula and the Mediterranean Islands.

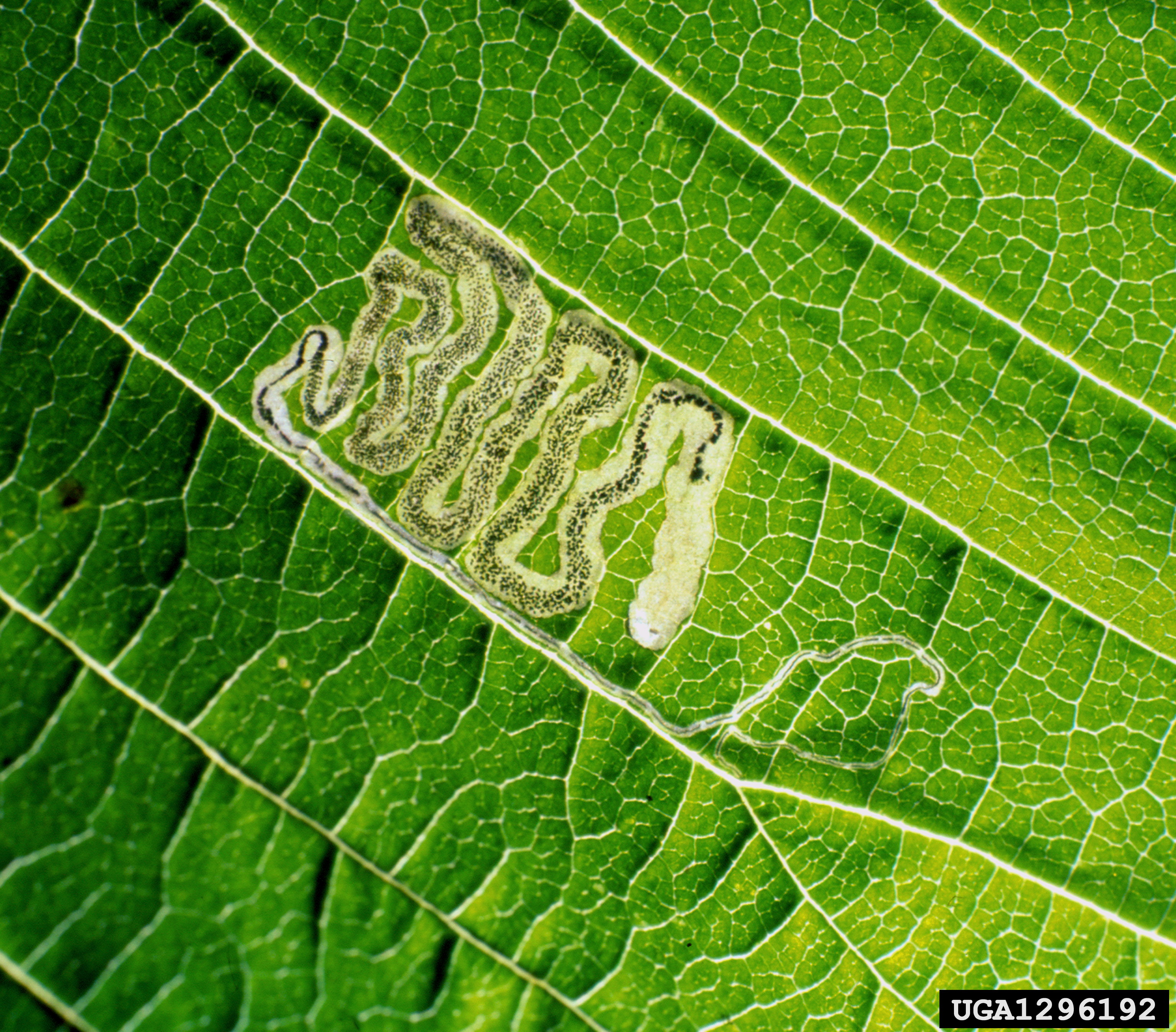
Stigmella tiliae mine

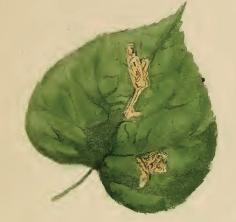
Mined lime leaf

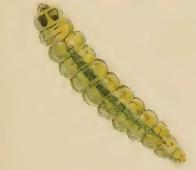
Larva

The wingspan is 4,2–5 mm. Adults are on wing from May to June and from July to August. There are two generations per year.

The larvae feed on Tilia alba, Tilia americana, Tilia cordata, Tilia x euchlora, Tilia platyphyllos, Tilia tomentosa, Tilia x vulgaris. They mine the leaves of their host. The mine consists of a gradually widening corridor.
