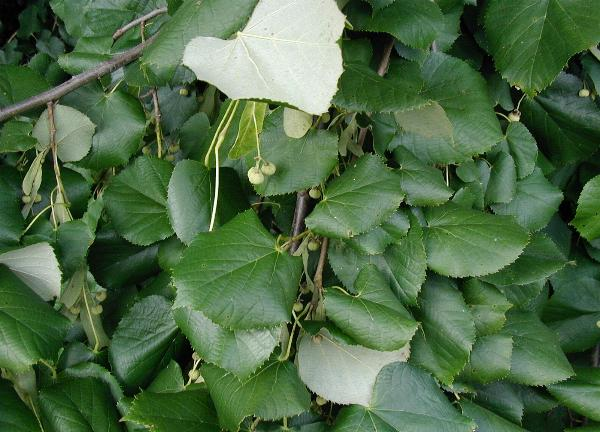

Scientific classification
- Kingdom: Plantae
- Clade: Tracheophytes
- Clade: Angiosperms
- Clade: Eudicots
- Clade: Rosids
- Order: Malvales
- Family: Malvaceae
- Genus: Tilia
- Species: T. tomentosa

Binomial name
- Tilia tomentosa Moench
- Distribution map

Synonyms
- List: Lindnera alba Fuss; Tilia alba Aiton; Tilia argentea DC.; Tilia gigantea Dippel; Tilia pannonica J.Jacq. ex Bayer; Tilia peduncularis Delile ex Bayer; Tilia petiolaris DC.; Tilia rotundifolia Vent.

= Tilia tomentosa =

Species of flowering plant

Tilia tomentosa, known as silver linden in the US and silver lime in the UK, is a species of flowering plant in the family Malvaceae, native to southeastern Europe and southwestern Asia, from Romania and the Balkans east to western Turkey, occurring at moderate altitudes.

== Description ==
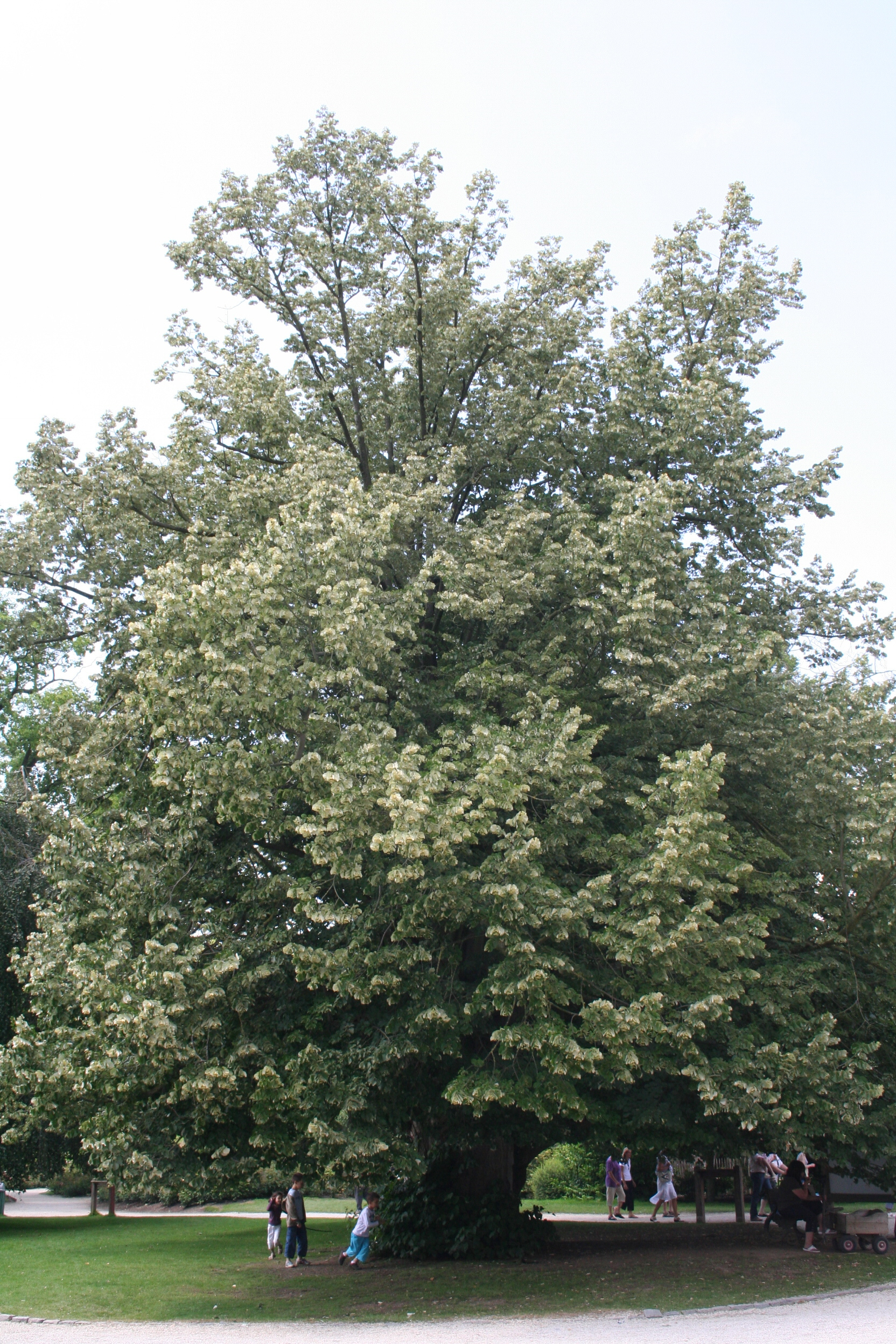
Tree in a public park in Belgium

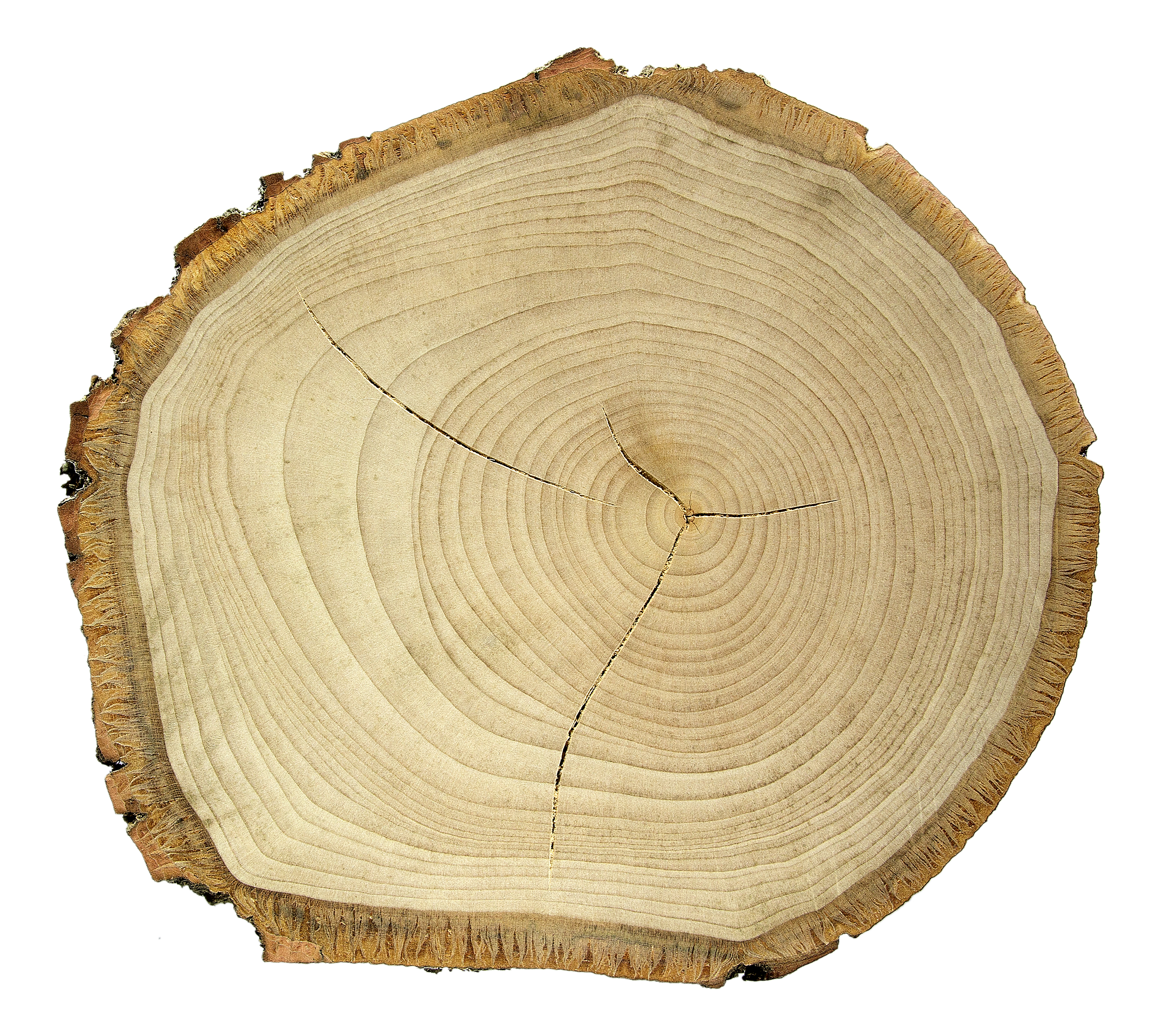
Tilia tomentosa - MHNT

Tilia tomentosa is a deciduous tree growing to 20–35 m (66–115 ft) tall, with a trunk up to 2 m (7 ft) in diameter. The leaves are alternately arranged, rounded to triangular-ovate, 4–13 cm long and broad with a 2.5–4 cm petiole, green and mostly hairless above, densely white tomentose with white hairs below, and with a coarsely toothed margin. The flowers are pale yellow, hermaphrodite, produced in cymes of three to ten in mid to late summer with a pale green subtending leafy bract; they have a strong scent and are pollinated by honeybees. The fruit is a dry nut-like drupe 8–10 mm long, downy, and slightly ribbed.

== Cultivation and uses ==
It is widely grown as an ornamental tree throughout Europe. The cultivar 'Brabant' has a strong central stem and a symmetrical conic crown. The cultivar 'Petiolaris' (pendent or weeping silver lime) differs in longer leaf petioles 4–8 cm long and drooping leaves; it is of unknown origin and usually sterile, and may be a hybrid with another Tilia species. It is very tolerant of urban pollution, soil compaction, heat, and drought, and would be a good street tree in urban areas. In cultivation in the UK, T. tomentosa 'Petiolaris' has gained the Royal Horticultural Society's Award of Garden Merit.

An infusion made from the flowers of T. tomentosa is antispasmodic, diaphoretic and sedative. This may be attributable to the presence of pharmacologically active ligands of benzodiazepine receptor.

A widespread belief is that the nectar of this species contains mannose, which can be toxic to some bees. This is incorrect; the sight of numerous comatose bees found on the ground at flowering time is rather a result of the paucity of nectar sources in late summer in urban areas. The evidence against a toxin in the nectar being responsible for mass bee deaths under Tilia trees is supported further by Koch and Stevenson (2017) who also suggest that the presence of caffeine in linden nectar may mean that linden trees can chemically deceive foraging bees to make sub-optimal foraging decisions, in some cases leading to their starvation.

This species, while fragrant in spring, drops buds and pollen during the spring and fall.

=== Notable trees ===
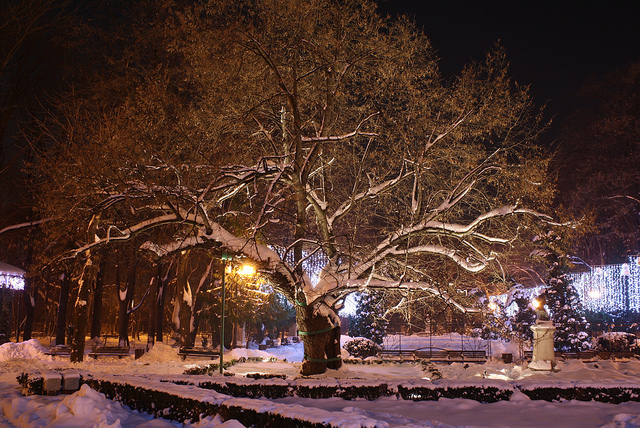
Eminescu's Linden Tree, Iaşi, Romania

Eminescu's Linden Tree (Romanian: Teiul lui Eminescu) is a 500-year-old silver lime situated in the Copou Public Garden, Iași, Romania. Mihai Eminescu reportedly wrote some of his best works underneath this silver lime, rendering the tree one of Romania's most important natural monuments and an Iași landmark.
