= Eminescu's Linden Tree =

500-year-old tree in Copou Park, Iași, Romania

Coordinates: 47°10′42.2″N 27°34′0.2″E

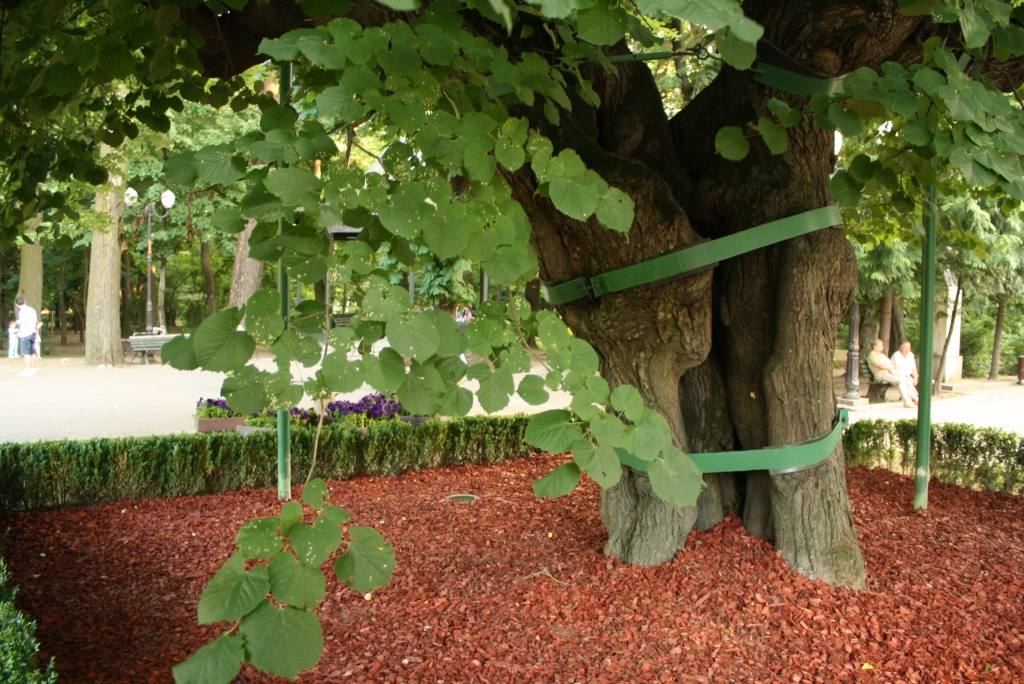
Eminescu's Linden Tree (close-up, June 2014)

Eminescu's Linden Tree (Romanian: Teiul lui Eminescu) is an approximately 500-year-old silver lime (Tilia tomentosa Moench) in Copou Park, Iași, Romania.

Mihai Eminescu reportedly wrote some of his best works underneath this lime, rendering the tree one of Romania's most important natural monuments and a Iași landmark.

== Age ==
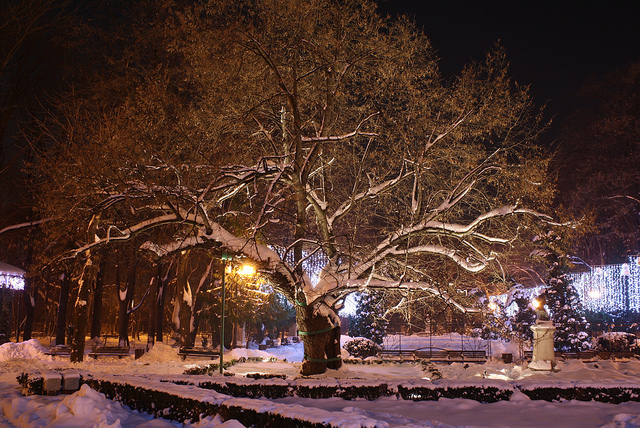
Eminescu's Linden Tree, December 2012.

According to the Iasi Environmental Protection Agency's official data, the tree is approximately 458 years old. A more recent survey conducted using an increment borer, placed the tree at 540 years of age (+- 3%).

== Civic symbol ==
The tree was used as a civic symbol by the students who protested, in February 2013, against the removal (by felling) of the linden tree alignment in the Iaşi city centre, and its replacement by the local municipality with miniature Japanese shrubs. In November 2015, the decision was reversed following a public referendum on the topic, which resulted in the reinstatement of limes in the city centre.

== Current status ==
In June 2014, Asociatia Dendro-Ornamentala "Anastasie Fatu Iasi," backed by the Iaşi Academic Group and the 'Iașul Iubește Teii' ('Iasi Loves Its Linden Trees') civic campaign, with support from 'Asociația Peisagiștilor din România' (ASOP) and 'Centrul de resurse pentru participare publica' (The Resource Center for Public Participation) (CeRe) (Bucharest), warned the City Hall over the tree's near critical condition, and asked for a number of emergency dendrological measures to be taken. Later the same month, the City Hall complied with the request and, under the supervision of ing. dr. Ionel Lupu (President, Asociatia Dendro-Ornamentala "Anastasie Fatu Iasi") proceeded to treating the lime with Bordeaux mixture, insect repellent and organic soil enrichments.

One day after the treatment, joined by local intellectuals and members of the public, ing. dr. Ionel Lupu, Professor Mandache Leocov and Professor Liviu Antonesei gathered near the tree and argued for the replanting of limes in the Iasi city centre, while accusing the City Hall of gross incompetence in managing the city's green spaces.

== Gallery ==
Eminescu's Linden Tree

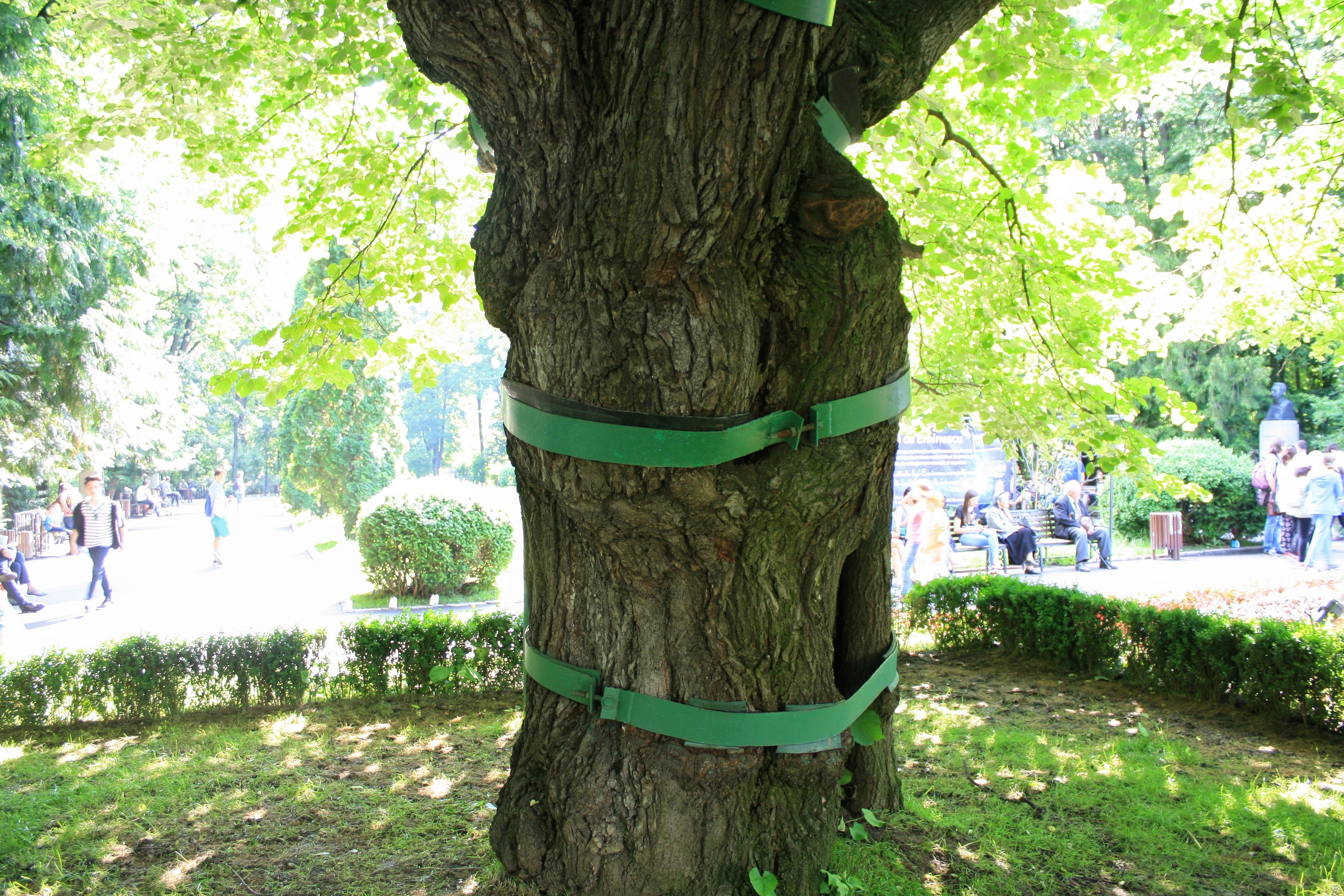

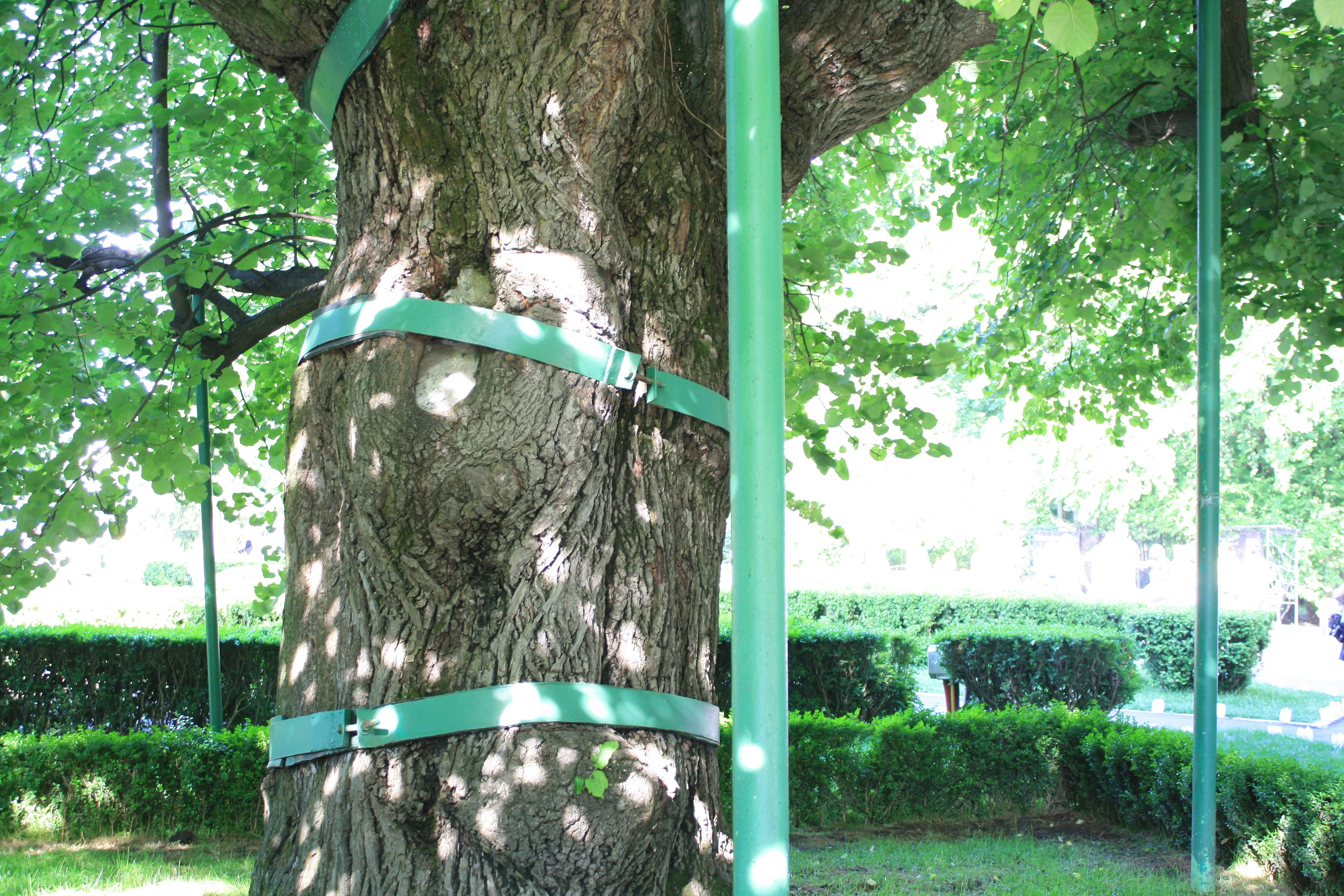

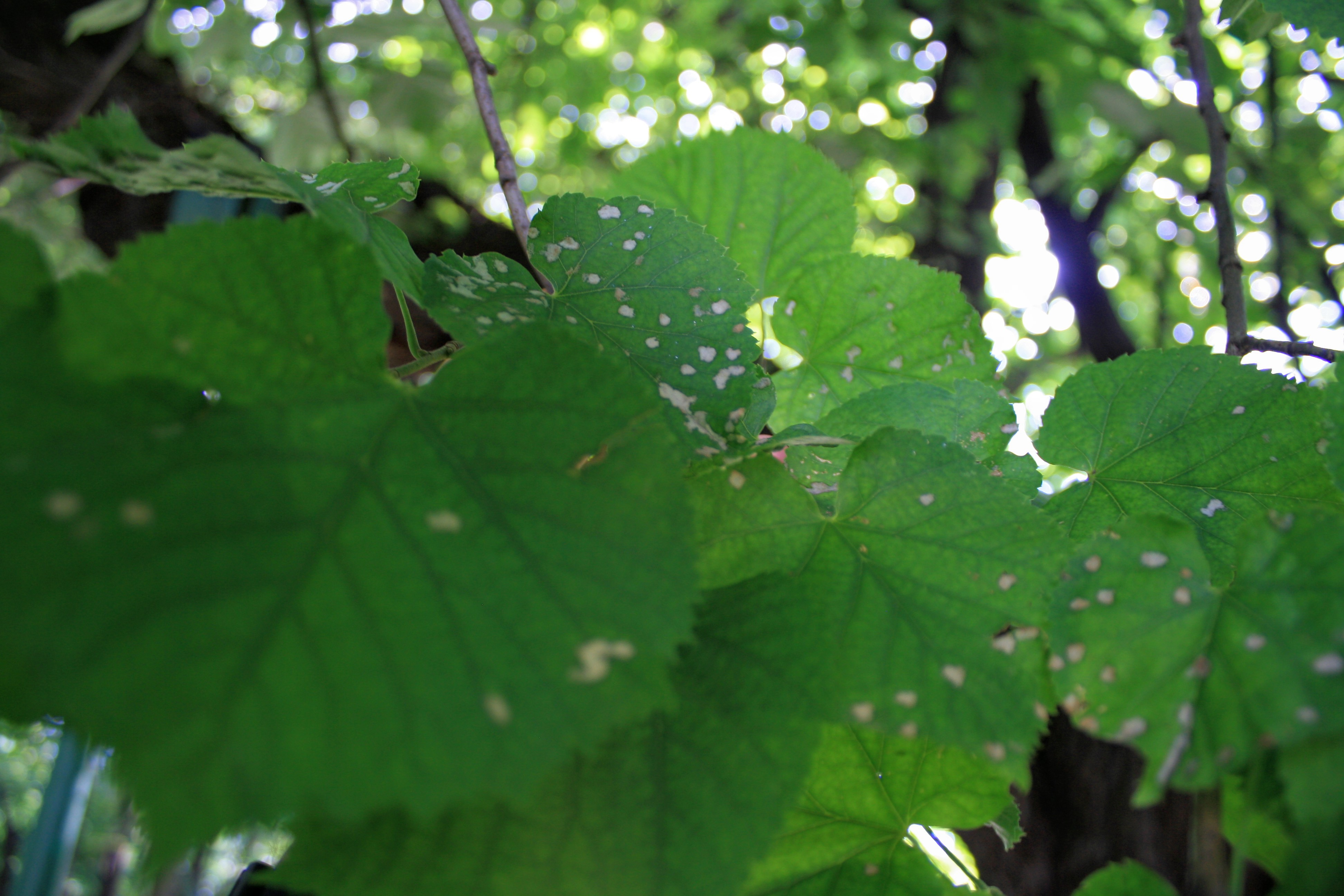

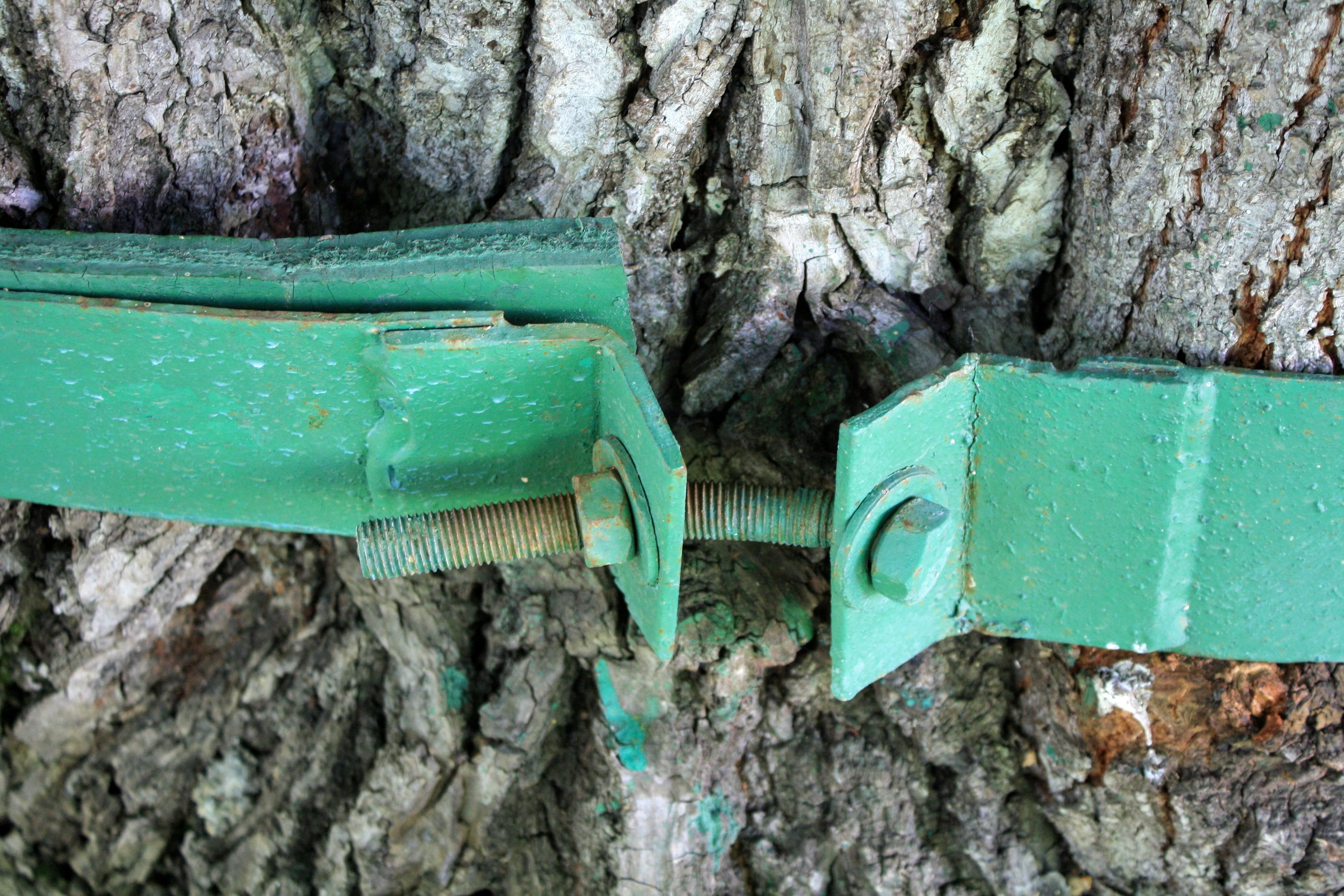

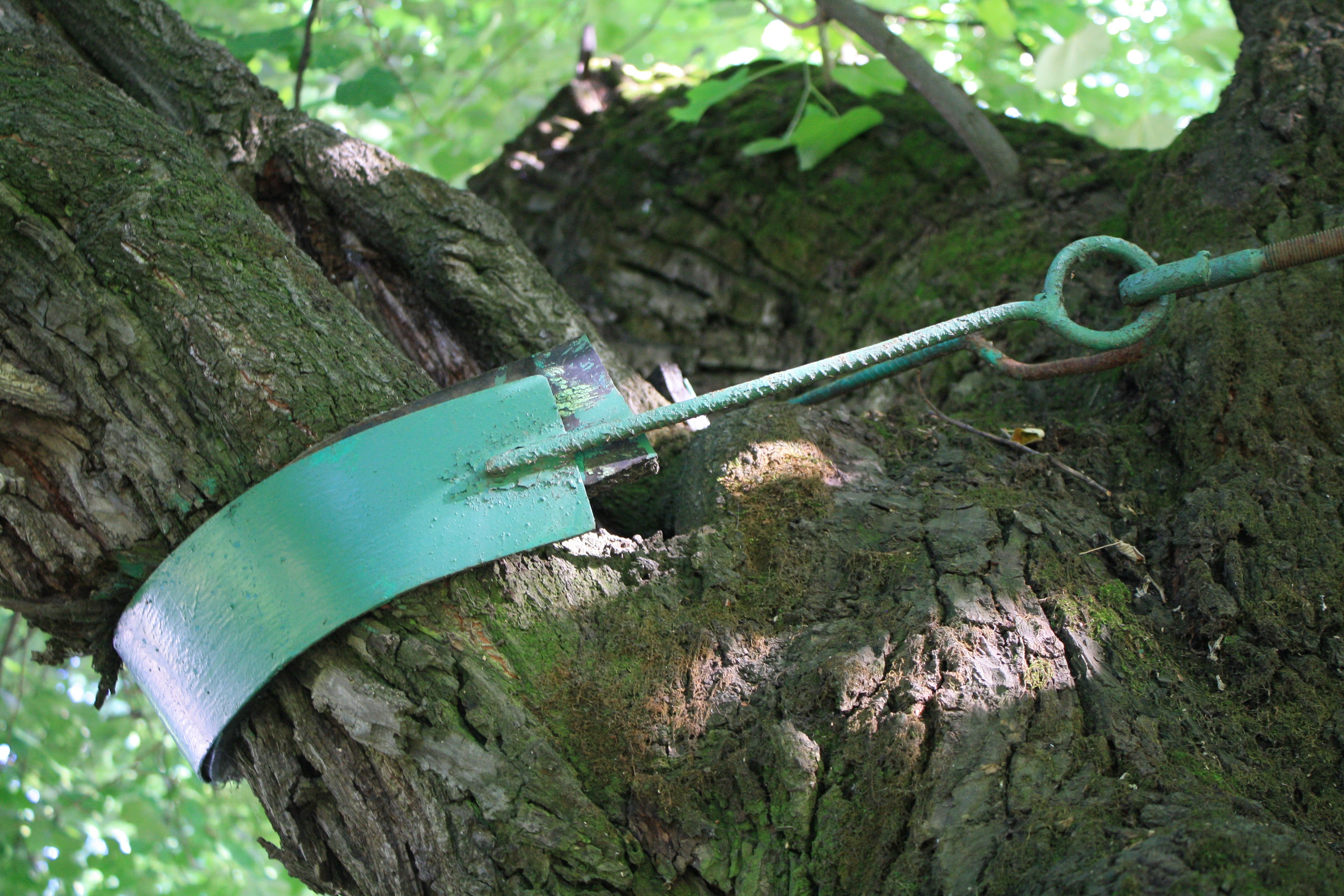

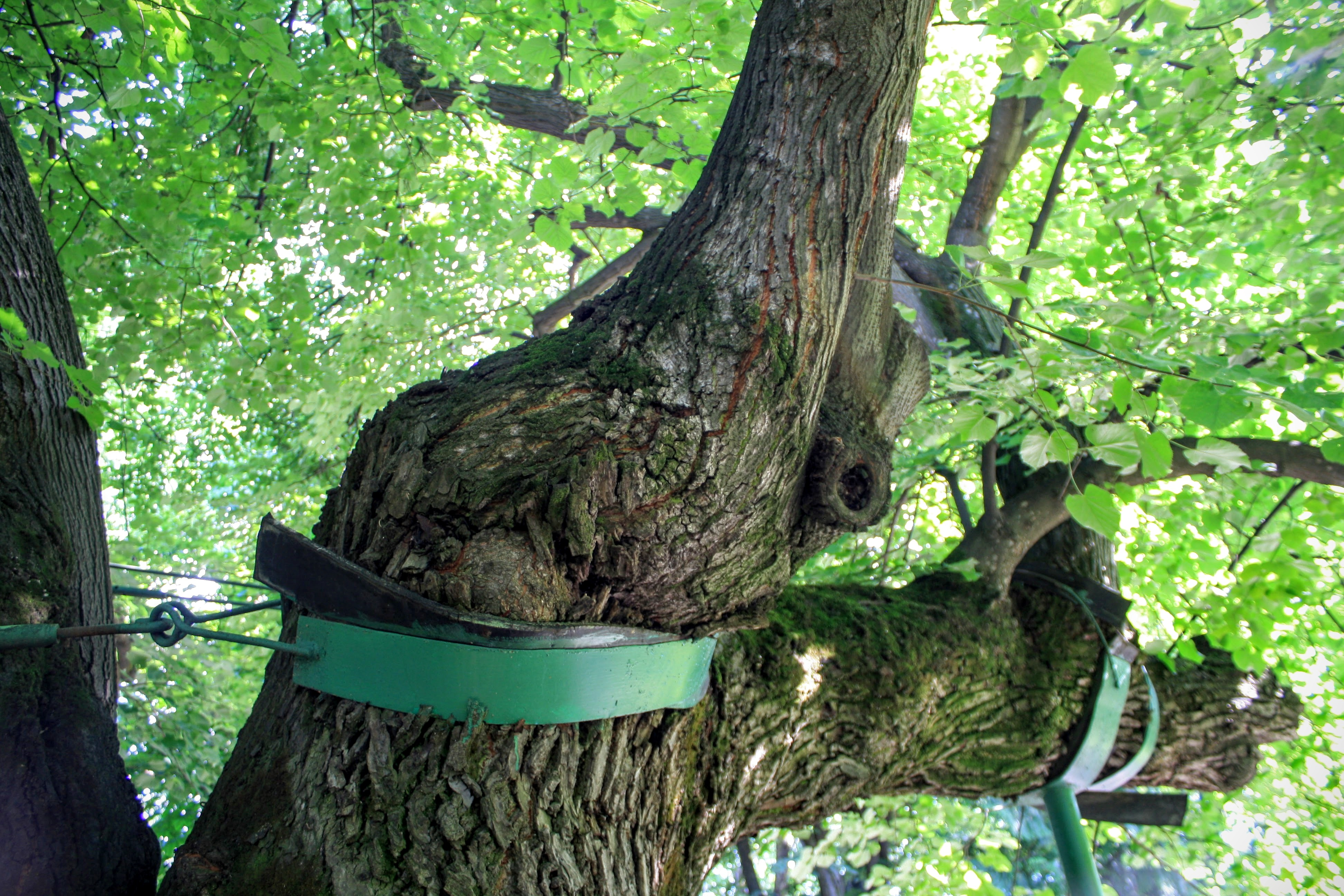

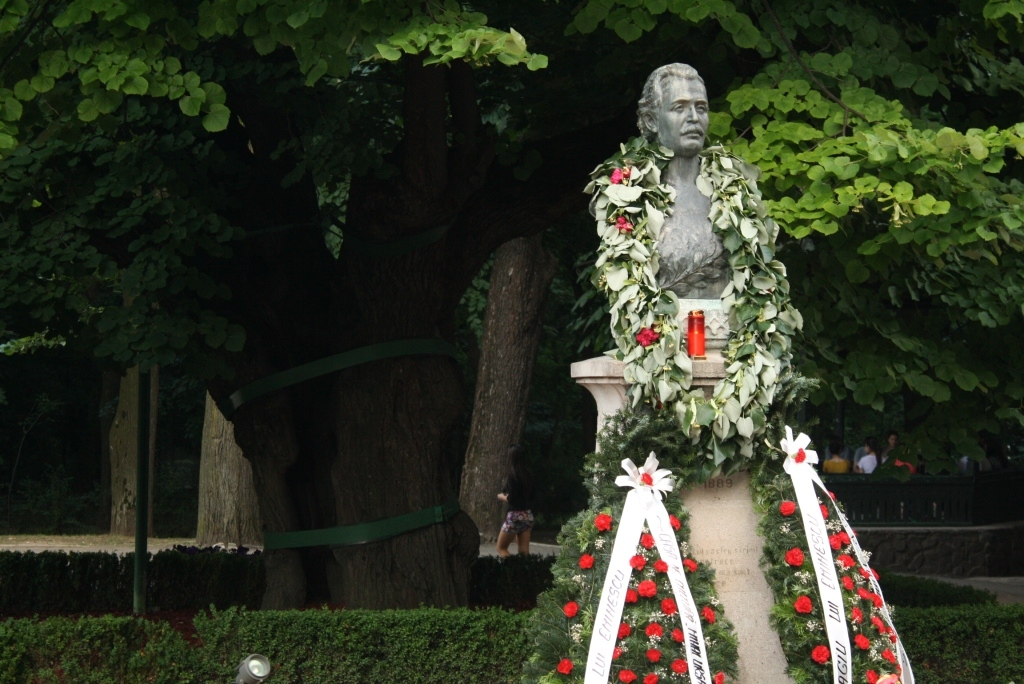

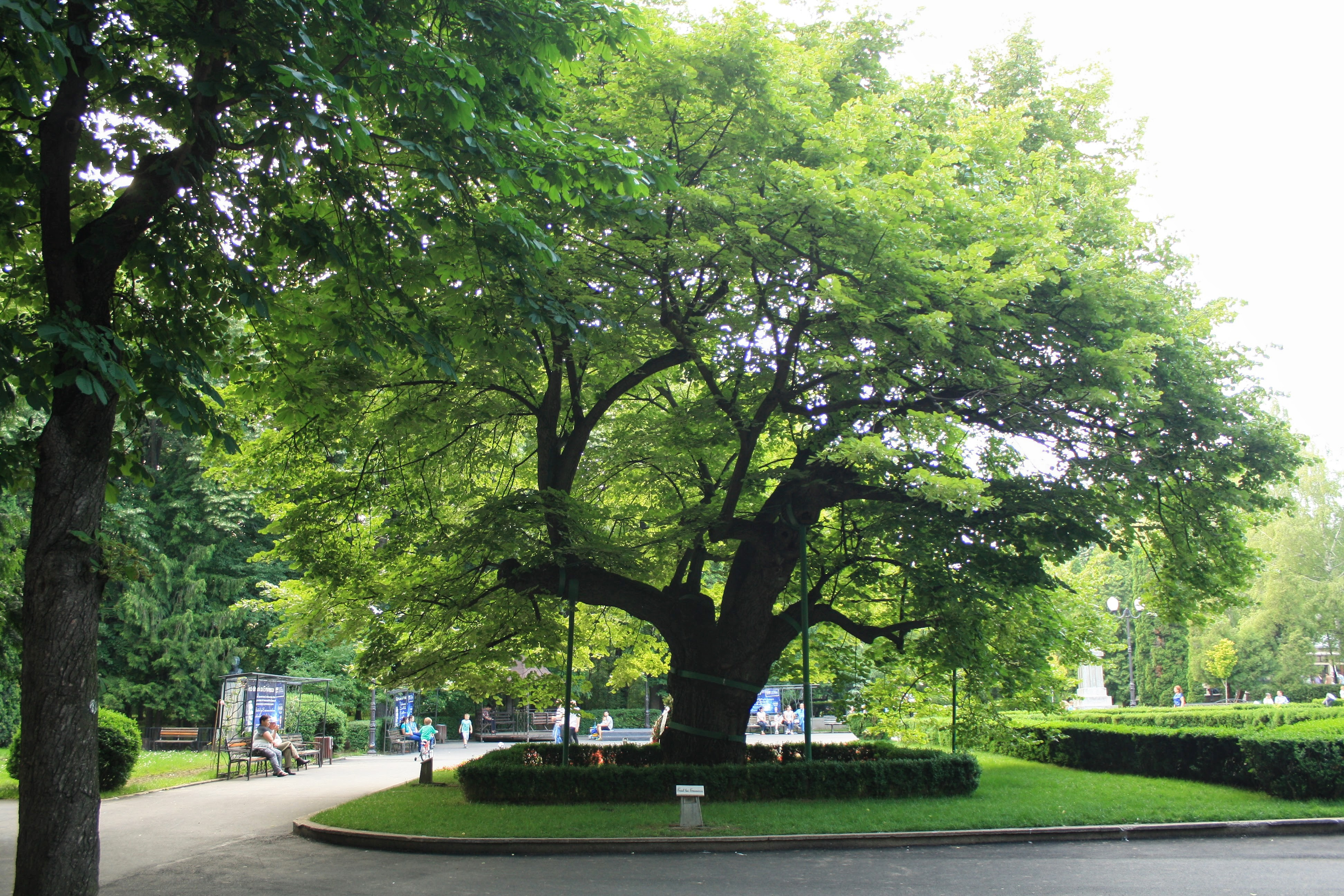

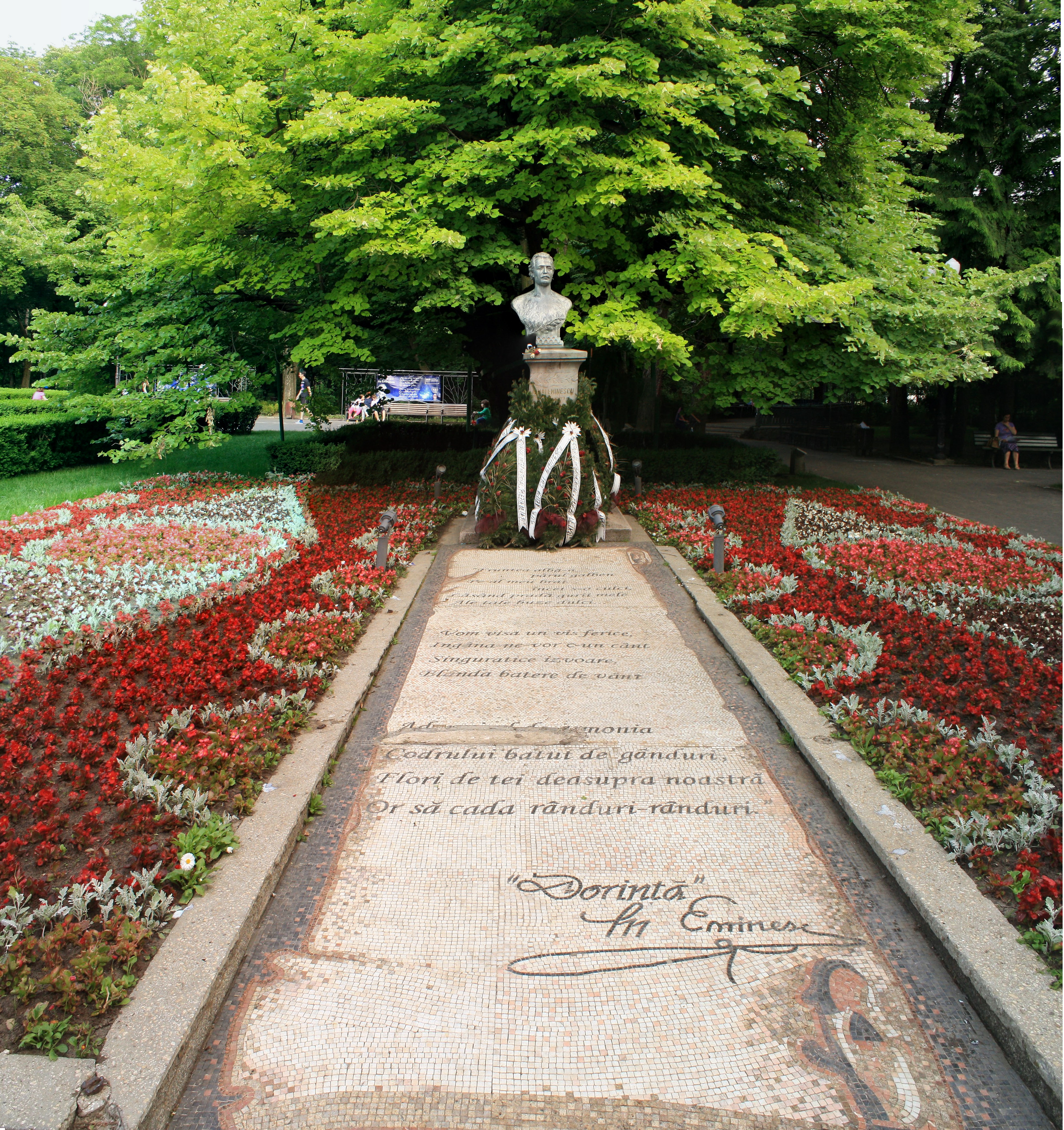
