= Copou Park =

Public park in Iași, Romania

Copou Gardens
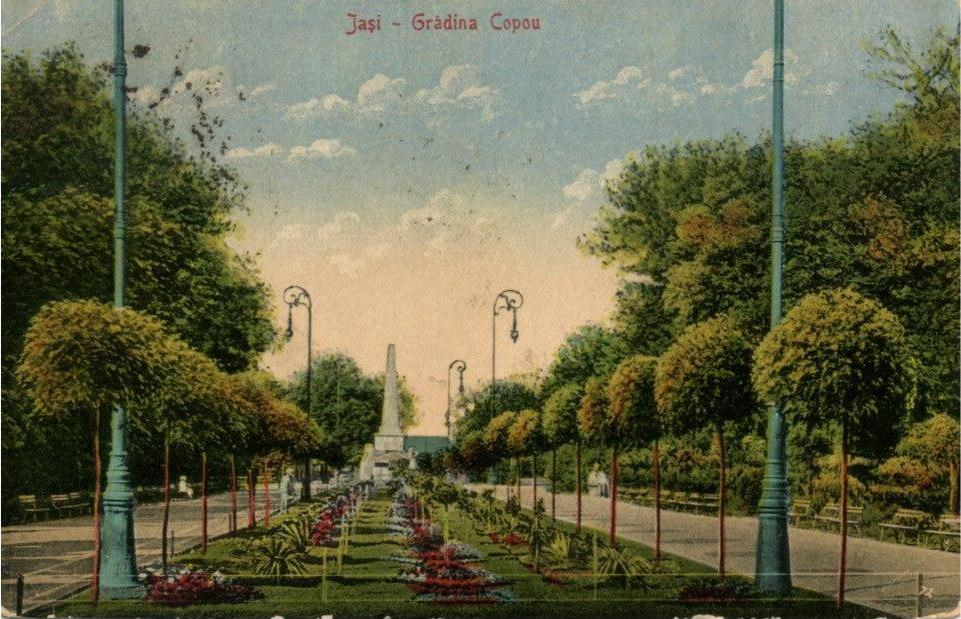
- Copou Park (circa 1900)
- Interactive map of Copou Gardens
- Type: Urban park
- Location: Iași
- Coordinates: 47°10′43″N 27°34′02″E
- Area: 10 ha (25 acres)
- Created: 1834

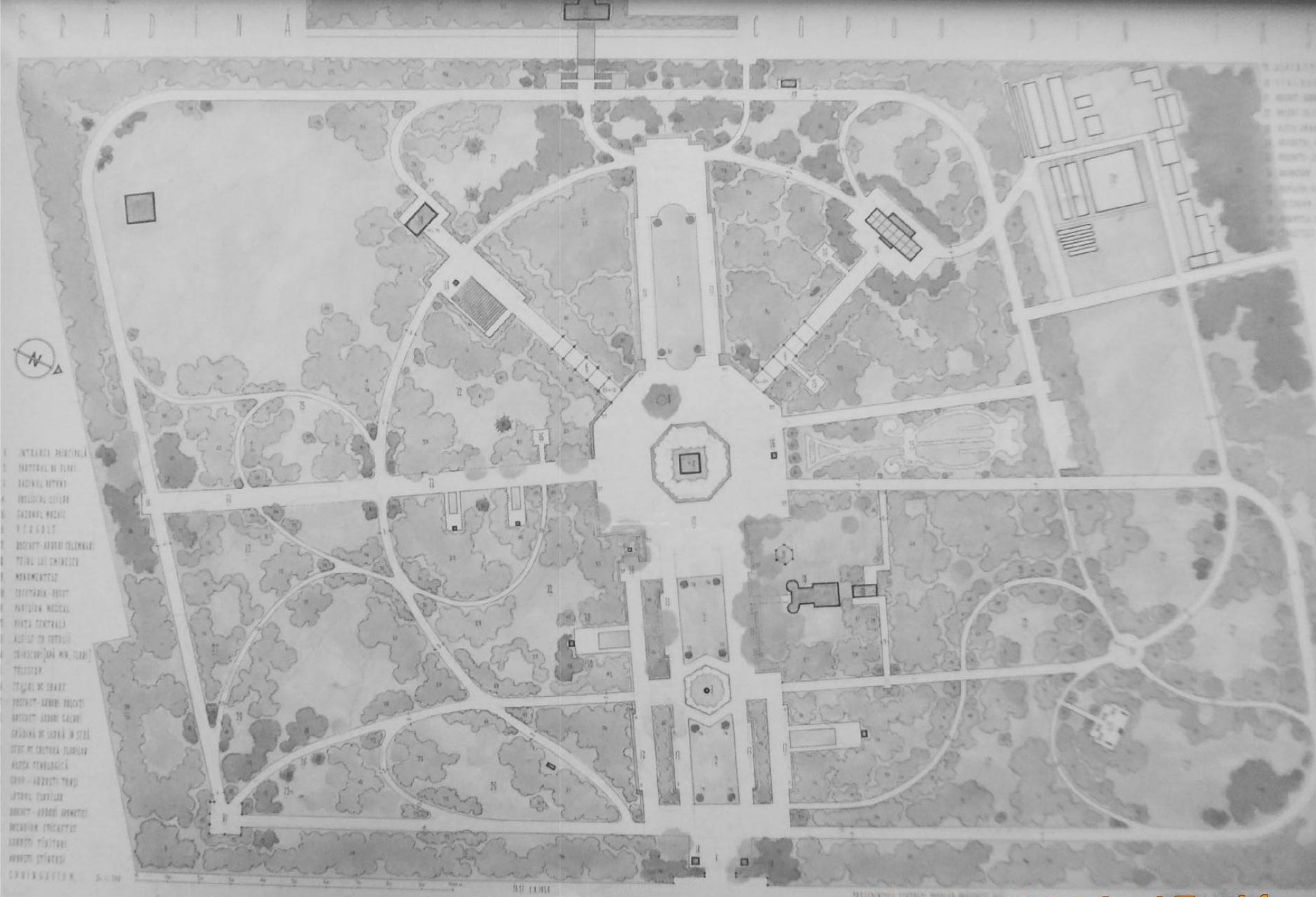
A map of Copou Park by Vsevlad Carmazinu-Cacovschi

The Copou Park or Copou Gardens is the oldest public park in Iași, Romania. Its development started in 1834 under the reign of Mihail Sturdza, making the park one of the first public gardens in Romania and a Iași landmark. In its centre lies the Lions' Obelisk (1834), a 13.5 m (44 ft) tall obelisk dedicated to Regulamentul Organic, the first law on political, administrative and juridical organization in the Romanian Principalities.

Other landmarks include Eminescu's Linden Tree, the Mihai Eminescu Museum and the Junimea Alley. The gardens are a popular destination for tourists and locals, as well as a favourite location for poetry festivals, photography exhibitions and art and craft fairs.

The park covers approximately 10 hectares (down from 19 hectares at the height of its late-19th century development) and has been described as one of the most beautiful public gardens in Moldavia.

== History ==
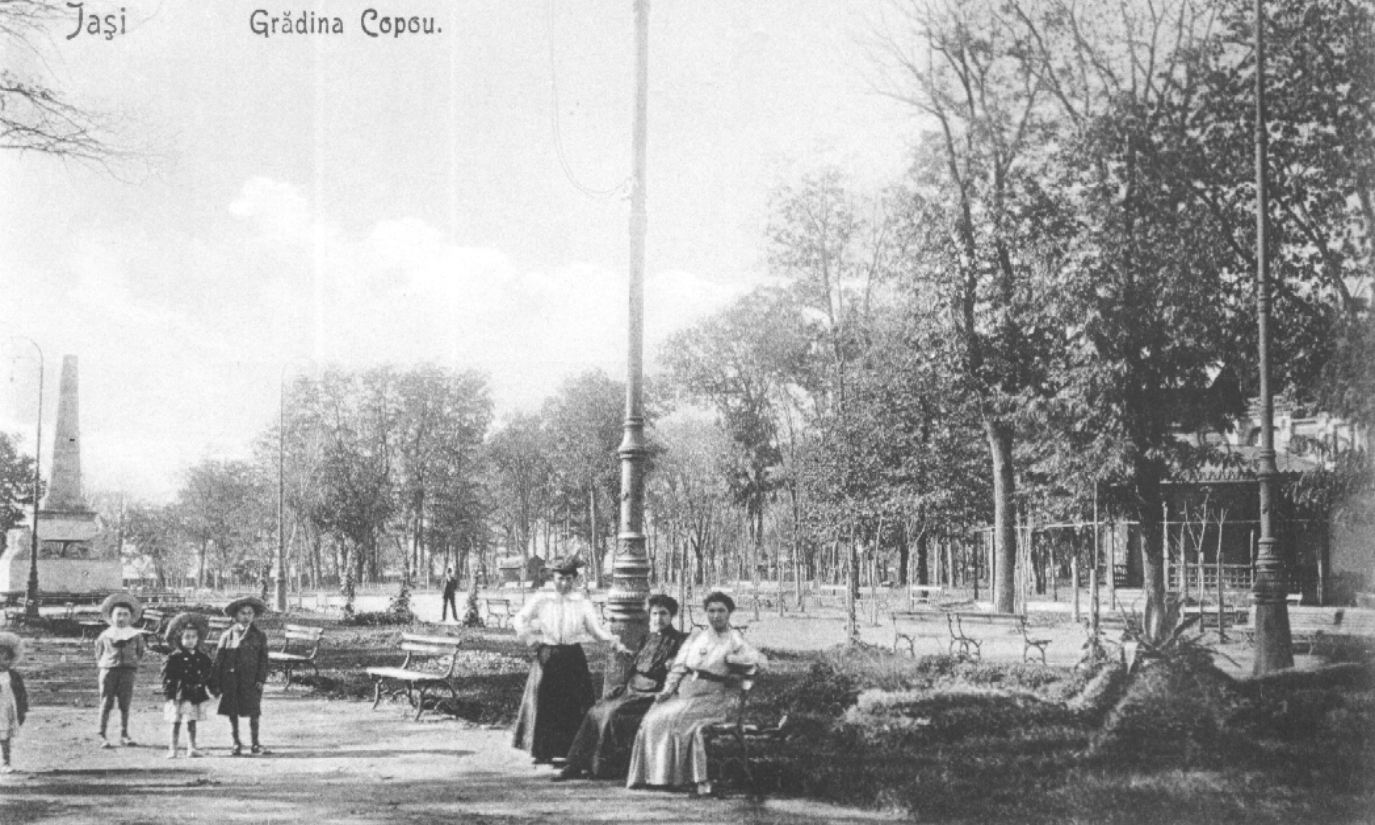
Visitors in Copou Park (archival image)

Beginning with the mid-19th century, Copou's new green spaces became a favourite destination for local gentry and aristocracy, prompting the city's more modest families to avoid the area for fear of exposing themselves to dandyish sarcasm. Usual visitors included persons such as Aglaia Moruzzi (notorious for her annual Copou festivities), Marghiolița Rosetti Rosnovanu, Leon Bogdan, Natalia and Elena Suțu, Maria Catargi, and Dimitrie Mavrocordat. The fashionable crowd of Moldavia's capital are known to have used their Copou excursions to engage in displays of social cohesion and play: "replacing their drawing rooms, the aristocratic Copou took on all of the functions of sociability, becoming an enormous public salon". The memoirs of Alecu Russo confirm the tableaux: "Copou is the theatre where young men make their worldly debut, all melancholy and laid back in their carriages, the usual cigarette hanging from the corner of their mouths ... Copou is also a scene that our ladies like to use, big and small, young and old, ugly or beautiful, to compete for brightness in their eye-catching outfits".

Jeffrey Gorney wrote similarly of Copou Park in his 2014 memoirs, describing it as "green and gracious ... where Great-Uncle Victor ran a beer garden; where my grandparents and their friends came to see and be seen; where strings of bulbs lit up the night with gaiety; and where wine and beer flowed freely and laughter peeled to the sound of violins and concertinas".

== Current status ==
A social-anthropological pilot study done for the municipality in December 2013 found that for the modern visitor Copou Park had become a symbolic place: its secular trees, many of them limes, facilitated the expression of positive feelings towards the past, as well as of "incredulity, bitterness, alienation ... or aggressiveness" with regard to the local administration's controversial decision to replace (by felling) a linden tree alignment in the city centre with miniature Japanese shrubs (a decision later reversed, following a 2015 public referendum on the topic).

== Images ==
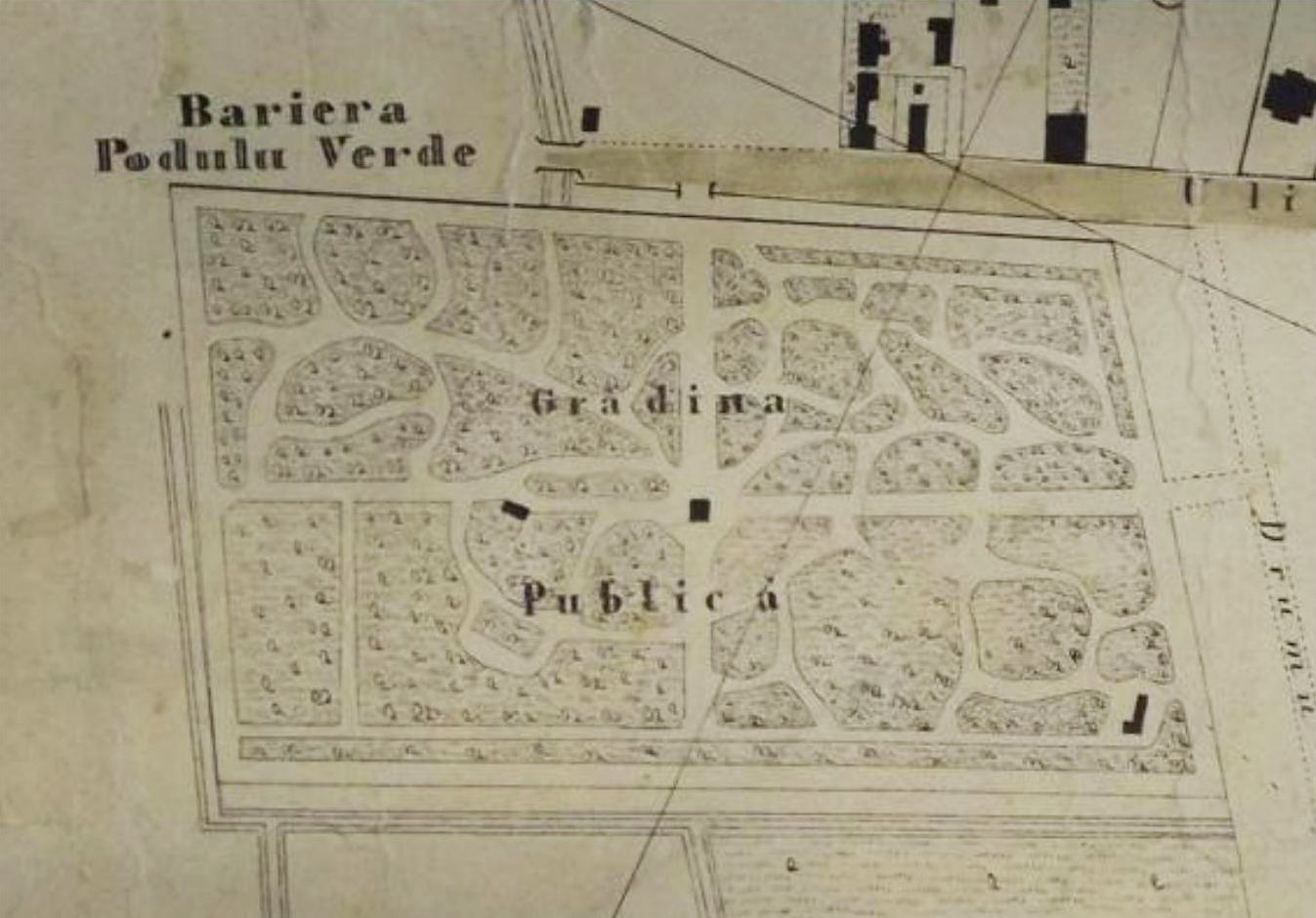
Historical map of Copou Park (1857)

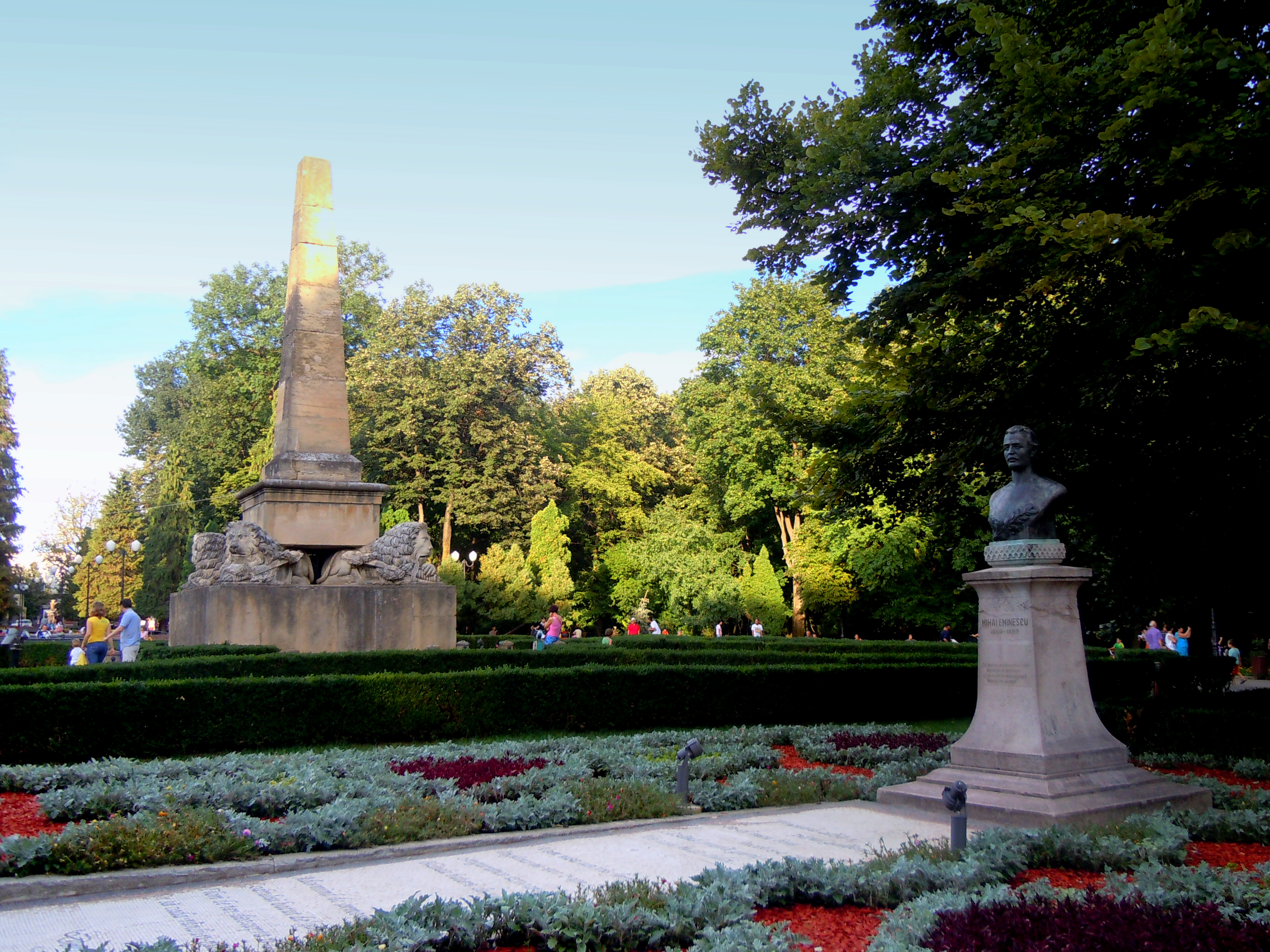
The Lions' Obelisk in Copou Park

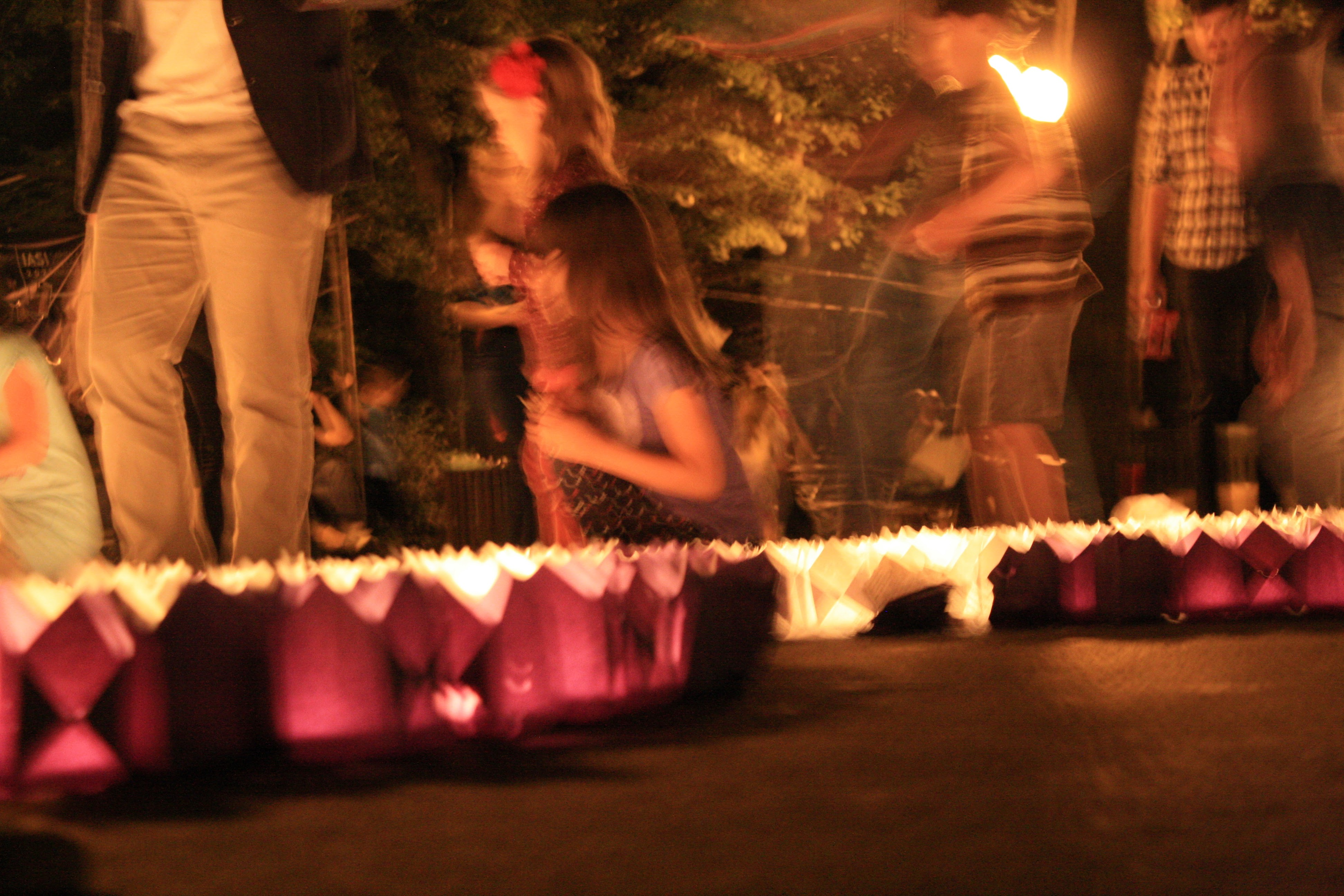
"Light Festival" in Copou Park (May 2016)

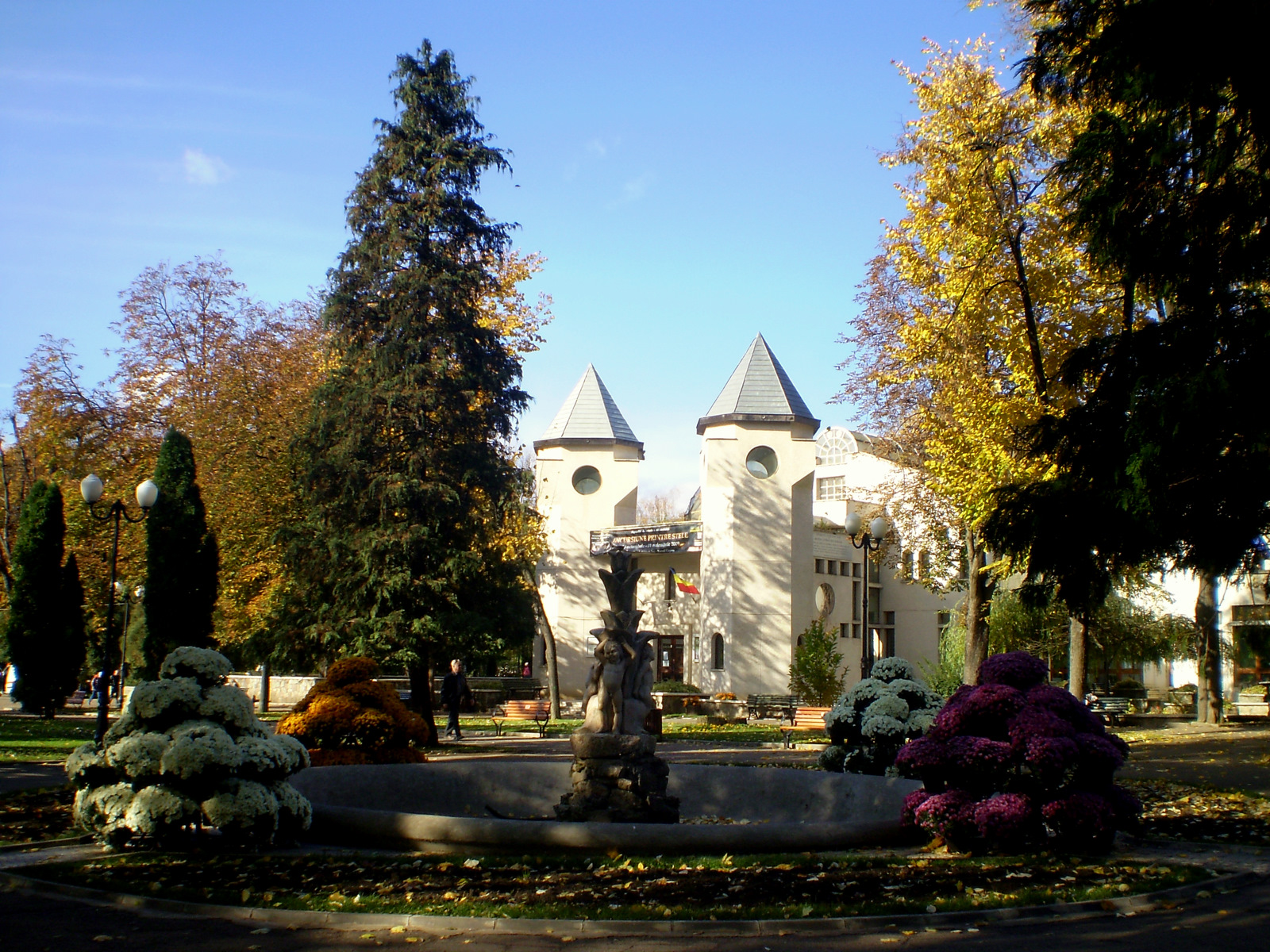
Mihai Eminescu Museum in Copou Park

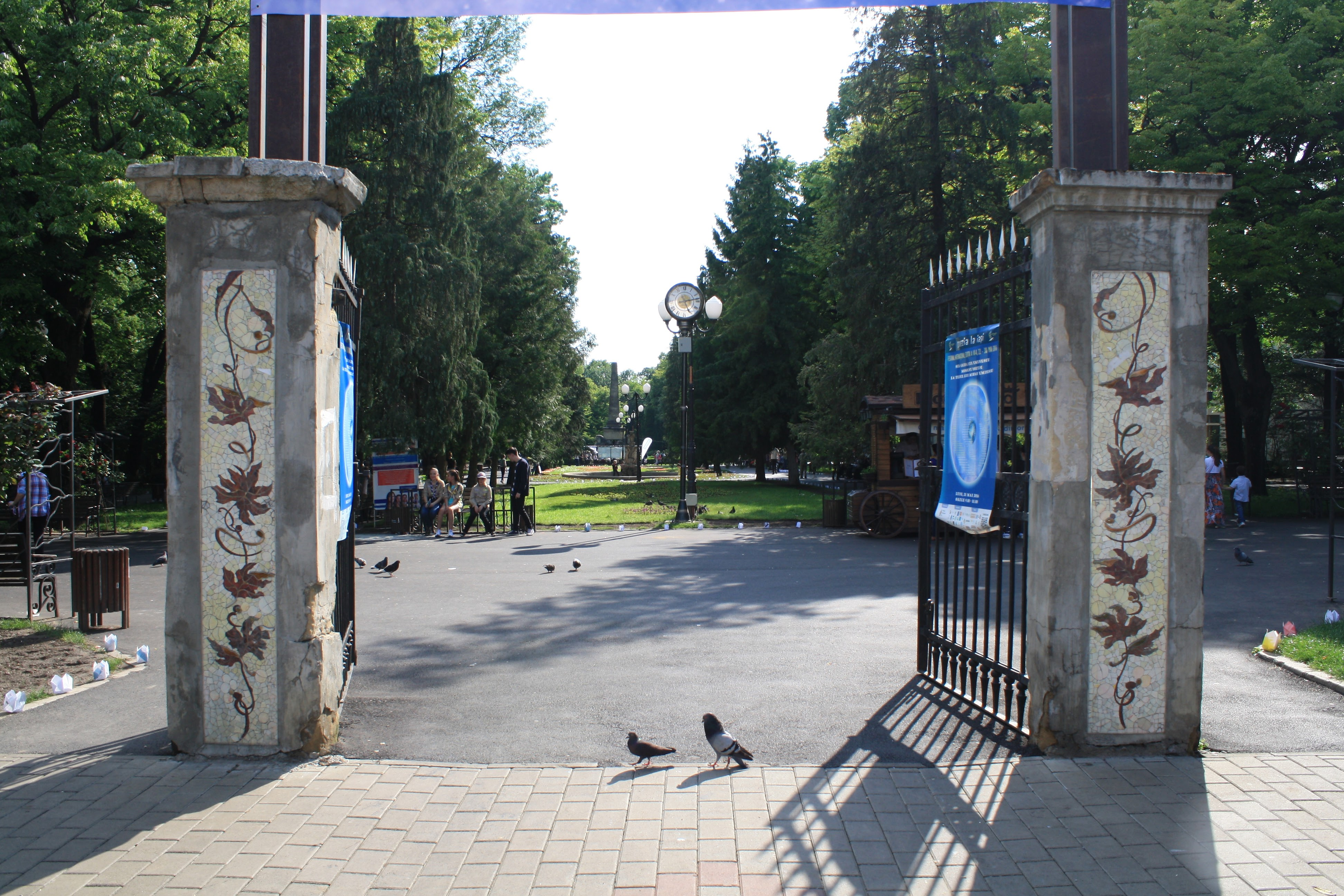
Main entrance in Copou Park

== See also ==
- Botanical Garden of Iaşi
