= Timeline of Eastern Orthodoxy in Greece (1453–1821) =

This is a timeline of the presence of Eastern Orthodoxy in Greece. The history of Greece traditionally encompasses the study of the Greek people, the areas they ruled historically, as well as the territory now composing the modern state of Greece.

== Ottoman rule (1453–1821) ==
"The fifteenth-century Ottoman Empire reunited the Roman Orthodox as subjects of their patriarch in Constantinople. Yet it was not the Byzantine Empire in disguise. Even though Mehmed the Conqueror resettled Constantinople as the centre of the Roman Orthodox world, he was even more effective in making it the capital of an Islamic empire." The privileges given to the Greek Church by Mehmed, in 1453, were able to save only a part of Byzantine Christendom from Islamization and Turkification, and most of those who remained Christians (and Greeks) accepted the unenviable fate of the rayas. Pressure to convert and the insecurity of Christian life produced widespread Crypto-Christianity in various regions, and there were also forced conversions and neo-martyrs. (Note: "Conversions were numerous during and immediately after the Balkan conquests, a phenomenon which especially disturbed Gennadius Scholarius. Conversions continued slowly and systematically thereafter, gaining considerable momentum during periods of Turkish military defeats and during campaigns against Christian powers. In Bulgaria substantial numbers of Christians were converted in the Rhodope regions during the sixteenth and seventeenth centuries. Perhaps the most significant conversions occurred in Bosnia, Herzegovina, and Albania, although they were consequential in Crete and Macedonia as well. This pressure to convert and the insecurity of Christian life produced widespread Crypto-Christianity in the regions of Trebizond, Nicaea, Central Anatolia, Crete, Cyprus, and resulted, too, in the Crypto-Judaism of the dömme' s. Conversion proceeded from a variety of causes: the desire to escape the serious disabilities of dhimmis and to enjoy the status of the favored class, the religious persuasion and syncretism of the missionary Dervishes; finally, there were forced conversions and neo-martyrs, and these seem to have been somewhat more widespread than has hitherto been thought.") In practice, Greeks were forbidden to build or furnish churches, to carry arms or to dress like Moslems. However following the example of Byzantine emperors, the Sultans hastened to ratify the ownership of land by the Church and by monasteries and renewed their privileges. British historian Sir Steven Runciman has written also that although it was Orthodoxy that preserved Hellenism throughout the dark centuries, without the moral force of Hellenism Orthodoxy itself might have withered.

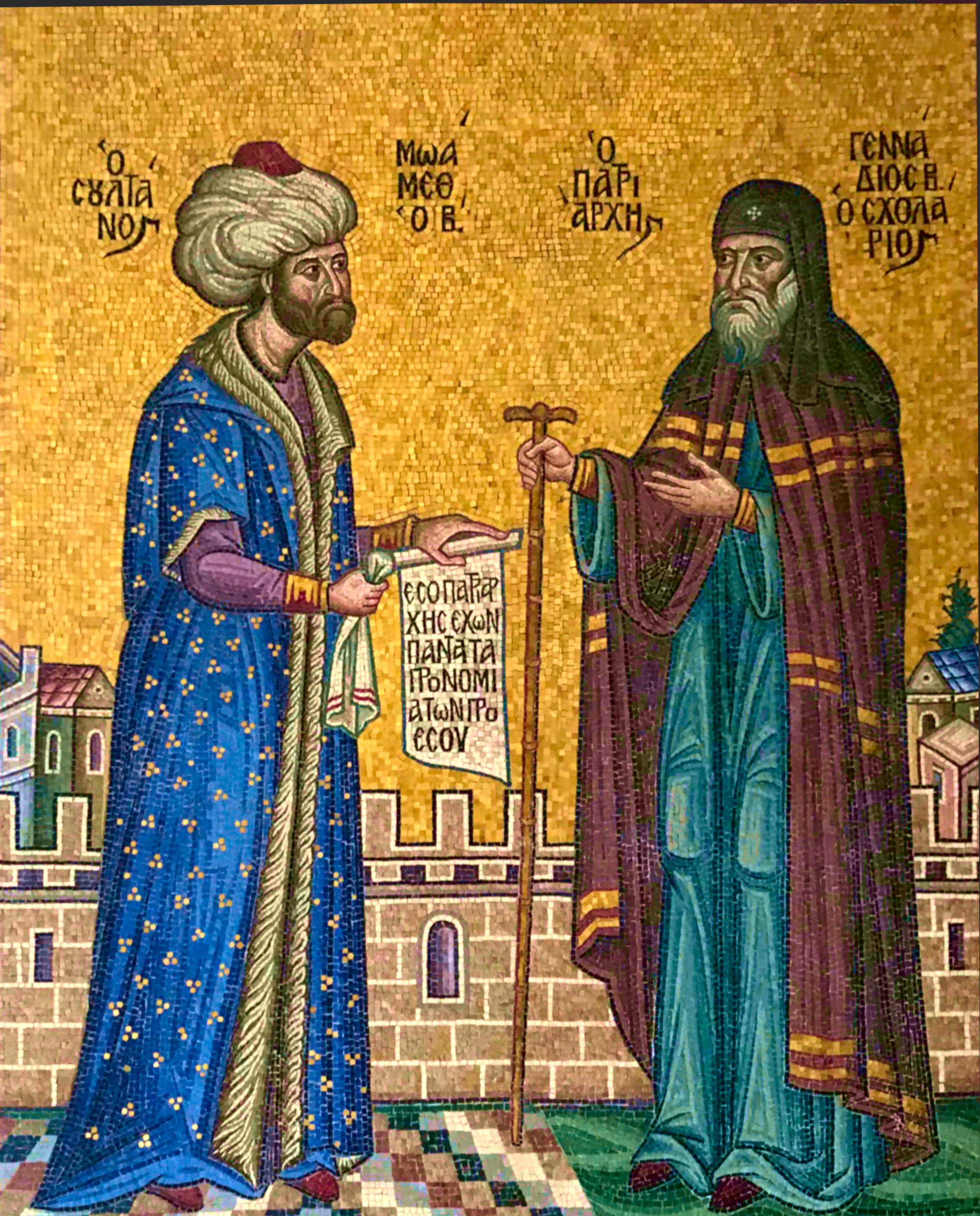
Patriarch Gennadios Scholarius with Mehmet II.

- 1454 Dismantling of a planned rebellion against Venetian rule in Crete. This became known as the conspiracy of Sifis Vlastos and was an opposition to the religious reforms for the unification of Churches agreed at the Council of Florence.
- 1454 Accession of Gennadius Scholarius as Ecumenical Patriarch of Constantinople (1454–56 and 1464–65), confirmed by Mehmed the Conqueror, who invested him with the signs of his office – the crosier (dikanikion) and mantle, and confirmed the Patriarch's ancient privileges; (Note: "Be Patriarch, and good fortune be with you. Count on our friendship in whatever you will, possessing all those privileges which the Patriarchs enjoyed before you.") in following the Islamic doctrine which enjoined tolerance towards Christians and Jews as "People of the Book," the religious Head of the Greek Church became also Ethnarch (Greek: ἐθνάρχης), thus establishing the Rūm millet (millet-i Rûm), or "Roman nation," the name of the Orthodox Christian community within the Ottoman Empire; (Note: "The ruling millet within the empire was made up of the Muslims. Next in importance was the Orthodox Christian millet-i Rūm, or "Greek" millet, as it was known. There was also an Armenian, a Jewish, a Roman Catholic, and even, in the 19th century, a Protestant millet. Although its head, the ecumenical patriarch, was invariably of Greek origin, the term "Greek" millet was something of a misnomer, for it included, besides the Greeks, Romanians, Bulgarians, Serbs, Albanians, Vlachs, and substantial Arab populations." By the recognition of the privileges of the Constantinople Patriarchate there was created within the framework of the Ottoman Empire, a para-state body, the Orthodox Church-State of the Greek nation. Note that although the powers of the ecumenical patriarch were indeed extensive, there is uncertainty as to the precise nature of the privileges granted by Sultan Mehmed II to the man whom he elevated to the highest office in the church.) (Note: According to Victor Roudometof, "by making all "Romans" (i.e., formerly Orthodox subjects of the Byzantine Empire) members of the Orthodox Rum millet , the Ottomans officially sanctioned the Church's Orthodox universalism, thus facilitating the legitimization of Grecophone ecclesiastical elites over the Balkan ethnies (ethnic communities). Additionally, after 1453, the Church assumed jurisdiction over the civil affairs of the Orthodox communities. Moreover, by virtue of his residing in the capital of the empire, the ecumenical patriarch was able to usurp in an informal but effective manner considerable power from the Orthodox patriarchates of Alexandria, Antioch, and Jerusalem. In the hierarchical structure of the Eastern Church, the ecumenical patriarch ranked first, followed by the other Orthodox patriarchates, the autocephalous archbishoprics of Cyprus, Pec, and Ohrid, and the local metropolitans (Papadopoullos 1990:94; Sarris 1990:2.421-524). In the eyes of the higher clergy, the Orthodox Church was the only legitimate bearer of the Christian tradition. For centuries, the enemy was the Roman Catholic Church, which consistently attempted to infiltrate the Orthodox world (Frazee 1983). Most post-1453 Grecophone publications were religious in nature, their major function being to counteract Catholic propaganda (Koumarianou, Droulia, and Layton 1986:135-157). The conflation of the Greek ethnic identity with Rum millet identity was an indispensable component of the Ottoman social system.") the Great School of the Nation is established in Constantinople under the direction of Greek Renaissance scholar Mathaeos Kamariotis, as a continuation of the University of Constantinople after the Fall of Constantinople.
- 1456–1458 Fall of Athens to the Ottoman Turks under Turahanoğlu Ömer Bey.
- 1456–1587 Byzantine Church of Theotokos Pammakaristos became the seat of the Ecumenical Patriarchate. (Note: Since the Fall of Constantinople in 1453, the Patriarchal churches have been: The Church of the Twelve Apostles (location of today's Fatih Mosque), 1453–1456.; The Church of Panagia Pammakaristos (today's Fethiye Mosque), 1456–1587.; The Church of the Virgin Mary of Vlahseraion in the Phanar, 1587–1597.; The Church of St. Dimitrios in Xyloporta (Ayvansaray), 1597–1600.; The Church of St. George in the Phanar, from 1601.)
- 1460 Parthenon Cathedral dedicated to the Mother of God, is turned into a mosque on the sultan's order.
- 1461 In July, the Byzantine general Graitzas Palaiologos honourably surrendered Salmeniko Castle, the last garrison of the Despotate of the Morea, to the invading forces of the Ottoman Empire after a year-long siege; on 15 August, the Empire of Trebizond, the last major Romano-Greek outpost, fell to the Ottoman Empire under Mehmed II, after a 21-day siege, bringing to a final end the Byzantine–Ottoman Wars.
- 1462 Death of Matrona of Chios.
- 1463 Demolition of the Byzantine Church of the Holy Apostles (which had served as a site of Byzantine imperial ceremony), then under Venetian rule, to make way for construction of the Fatih Mosque; (Note: While the circumstances of its destruction remain murky, it has been argued that the demolition of the church was subsumed into the rhetoric of conflict as Mehmet conquered Venetian territory along the Adriatic, and as Pope Pius II tried to stir enthusiasm for a crusade in 1464.) Greek scholar and pro-unionist Basilios Bessarion, formerly an Orthodox Metropolitan, later becoming a Roman Catholic Cardinal, is given the purely ceremonial title of Latin Patriarch of Constantinople by Pope Pius II.
- 1472 Decrees of the Council of Ferrara-Florence are repudiated by a Council of Contantinople; marriage of Ivan III of Russia to Princess Zoe-Sophia Palaiologina, a niece of Constantine XI, the last Byzantine emperor, leading to the doctrine of Moscow as the Third Rome. (Note: Through Sophia Palaiologina's influence, along with the members of the great Byzantine families, churchmen and intellectuals who sought refuge in Russia, the ceremonious etiquette of Constantinople along with the imperial Double-headed eagle and all that it implied was adopted by the court of Moscow, and Russia was laid wide open to Greek influence.)
- 1480 Patriarch Maximus III wrote to the Doge of Venice asking for an end to the persecution of Orthodox clergy and for permission to collect a special levy for the patriarch. (Note: "Orthodox dioceses were divided between Roman Catholic Venetian rulers and the Ottoman sultanate. Whereas under the latter they enjoyed relative freedom of religious expression, this was not the case in the Venetian-ruled areas. There all Orthodox bishops and metropolitans were replaced by Latin representatives of the pope. The whole of the next century was marked by attempts at proselytization by the Roman Catholics, which were intensified after the eruption of the Protestant movement.)
- 1489–1571 Church of Cyprus is subordinated to the Venetian rule, which ends with the siege and capture of Nicosia and Famagusta by the Ottomans.
- 1494 The Aldine Press is set up in Venice by the Italian humanist, printer and publisher Aldo Manuzio, becoming the greatest international force in spreading the Venetian study of Greek, including the great masterpieces of Antiquity, as well as the works of later Greek writers, theological, educational, ethical and secular.
- 1498 The Typikon of Manuel II Palaeologus of 1394 is issued on Mt. Athos.
- 16th–17th centuries. Pax Ottomanica , or Ottoman Peace, characterized by the prosperity of the early Ottoman centuries, especially during the reign of Suleiman the Magnificent (1520–1566), and by the relative religious tolerance of this multi-religious and multi-ethnic empire, in an age when most European monarchs by contrast tried to impose religious homogeneity upon their subjects (i.e. Protestant Reformation and Roman Catholic Counter-Reformation in the West). (Note: "There was no official interference with Greek religion. In many cases the Greeks preferred the tolerance of Turkish rule to the proselytising Catholicism of the Venetians. Greece was spared the religious conflicts that racked much of Europe: the St. Bartholomew's Day massacre of Huguenots in France, the Inquisition in Spain.") (Note: The Pax Ottomanica was also characterized by the Timar system of land management, a non-hereditary form of land management where the ownership of the land was held by the Ottoman state, but was granted temporarily as a fief to Timar holders who served the state. Therefore the Timar holders were given the authority to control arable lands, vacant land, or land possessed by peasants, as well as wastelands, fruit trees, forests or waters within their Timar territory. This system thus guaranteed an appreciable amount of local self-determination, as long as the taxes were paid. However by the end of the sixteenth century the Timar system of land tenure had begun its unrecoverable decline. And by the early decades of the seventeenth century Timars would not be reassigned, but were brought under imperial domain. With no new land to be divided up, the more powerful military commanders began to turn on the Ottoman Empire and its head of state, the Sultan, and they carved up the Empire into private land holdings called Chifliks, which became hereditary. The chiflik system marked the period when the Empire began to collapse, with a commensurate growing intolerance of Orthodox Christians. Some chiflik rulers like Ali Pasha of Ioannina ruled autonomous kingdoms inside the Empire.)
- 1511 Death of Joseph the Sanctified of Crete.
- 1517 Recognition of the Patriarchate of Alexandria by Selim I, on the Sultan's conquest of Egypt.
- 1518 Church of Saints Peter and Paul of the Greeks in Naples, Italy is founded to serve the needs of Greek Orthodox faithful who became refugees after the Fall of Constantinople. (Note: "Already from the seventies of the fifteenth century, men of note had begun to arrive in the Kingdom of Naples as refugees from Greece, especially from the Peloponnese. Owing to their origin and to the political ties between Greece and the country in which they had found hospitality, these exiles in Naples were particularly active in helping the various movements of revolt against Ottoman rule. The Greek church in Naples was founded in 1518.")

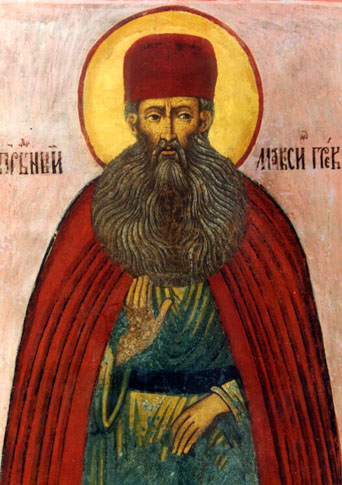
St. Maximos the Greek, monk, publicist, writer, scholar, humanist and translator active in Russia.

- c. 1520 Sultan Selim I, who disliked Christianity, suggested to his vizier that all Christians should be forcibly converted to Islam. (Note: When he was told that this was impracticable, he demanded that at least all of their churches should be surrendered. The vizier warned the patriarch, Theoleptus I, who engaged the services of a clever lawyer called Xenakis. Theoleptus admitted that he had no firman protecting the churches. It had been burnt in a fire at the Patriarchate, he said. But Xenakis was able to produce three aged Janissaries who had been present when the conquering Sultan entered Constantinople. They swore on the Koran that they had seen a number of notables from the city come to the Sultan as he was waiting to make his entrance and offer him the keys of their respective districts. In return he promised them that they could retain their churches. Sultan Selim accepted this evidence and even allowed the Christians to reopen some of their churches which his officials had closed. All the same, several more churches were annexed during his reign.)
- 1522 The first printed copy of the Septuagint (earliest extant Greek translation of the Old Testament from the original Hebrew) was issued in the Complutensian Polyglot Bible (1514–22).
- 1526 New Martyr John of Ioannina.
- 1530 Mother of God restores sight to blind youth through the Cassiope icon of Corfu.
- 1537 Sultan Suleiman the Magnificent implemented a tolerant and judicious religious policy over his multinational empire, and granted to Christians 'the great privilege of ours, to practise our religion freely and without any impediment.' (Note: "The Ottoman Empire was also going through a deep transformation of its own after the conquest of Egypt (1517) by Selim I (the Grim) and the relocation to the capital of a considerable number of theologians and administrators from the stronghold of Islamic traditionalism. As a result, their presence increased tension between Sunnis and Shiites, and led to consideration of the forced Islamization of the Christian population. The same was attempted in 1537 by Selim’s successor Suleiman; both requests were rejected by the administration and the Grand Mufti of Constantinople as being against the teachings of the Qur’an about the 'people of the book' .)
- 1541 Patr. Jeremiah I founds Stavronikita monastery.
- 1554 New Martyr Nicholas of Psari in Corinth.
- 1556 Death of Maximos the Greek, Greek monk, publicist, writer, scholar, humanist, and translator active in Russia.

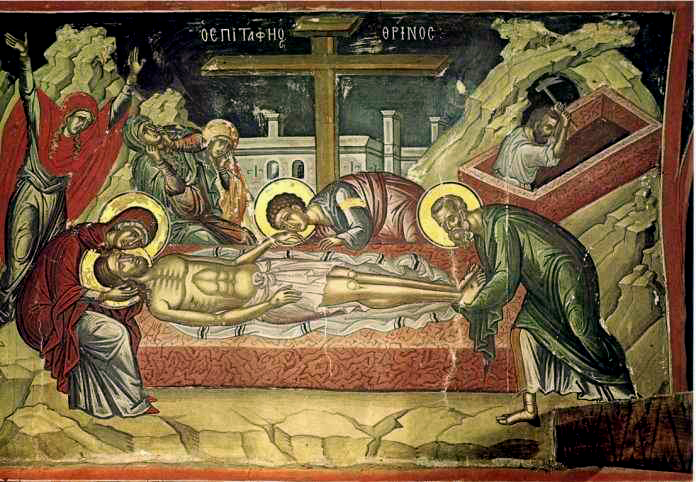
O Epitaphios Threnos ("The Lamentation at the Tomb") by Theophanes the Cretan, 16th century (Stavronikita monastery, Mount Athos).

- 1556–65 The Patriarchal School of Joasaph II is initially established in Constantinople as a Greek school under the direction of Ioannes Zygomalas, being the forerunner of the later Great School of the Nation.
- 1559 Death of Icon painter Theophanes the Cretan (Theophanes Strelitzas).
- 1561 Compilation of the Nomocanon of Manuel Malaxos, a notary of the Metropolitan Diocese of Thebes, having a wide circulation, with a version in classical Greek and another in modern Greek. (Note: In its administration of justice the Church based itself on canon and Byzantine law, including the Hexabiblos of Harmenopoulos (1345), and the Nomocanon of Manuel Malaxos (1561). See: British Library – Digitised Manuscripts. Harley MS 5554 – Nomocanon of Manuel Malaxos in 291 chapters. Date: 14 Dec 1675).)
- 1565 The inhabitants of Epirus and Albania rose and slaughtered the officers charged with carrying out the child levy, but the Sultan sent to the local Sanjak-bey a reinforcement of 500 Janissaries and the revolt was put down.
- 1569 All the landed property of the monasteries in the Ottoman Empire are confiscated by Sultan Selim II.
- 1571–1878 Restoration of Church of Cyprus to Orthodox rule, under the Ottomans. (Note: "The conquest of the island by the Ottomans in 1571 resulted in radical changes in the legal position of the different churches existing in Cyprus. The period of Ottoman rule lasted for more than 300 years, until 1878, and marked the first appearance of adherents of the Islamic faith in Cyprus. The Sheri (Sharia) Law, namely the interpretation of the Qurani Law, was not only the personal law of the Moslems of Cyprus, but also the state law, thus replacing the law of the Assizes, which had been the state law during the period of Frankish and Venetian rule. The Sheri Law was applied by the Sheri courts, which were the competent courts for the legal affairs of all people living in the island, irrespective of their religion.")

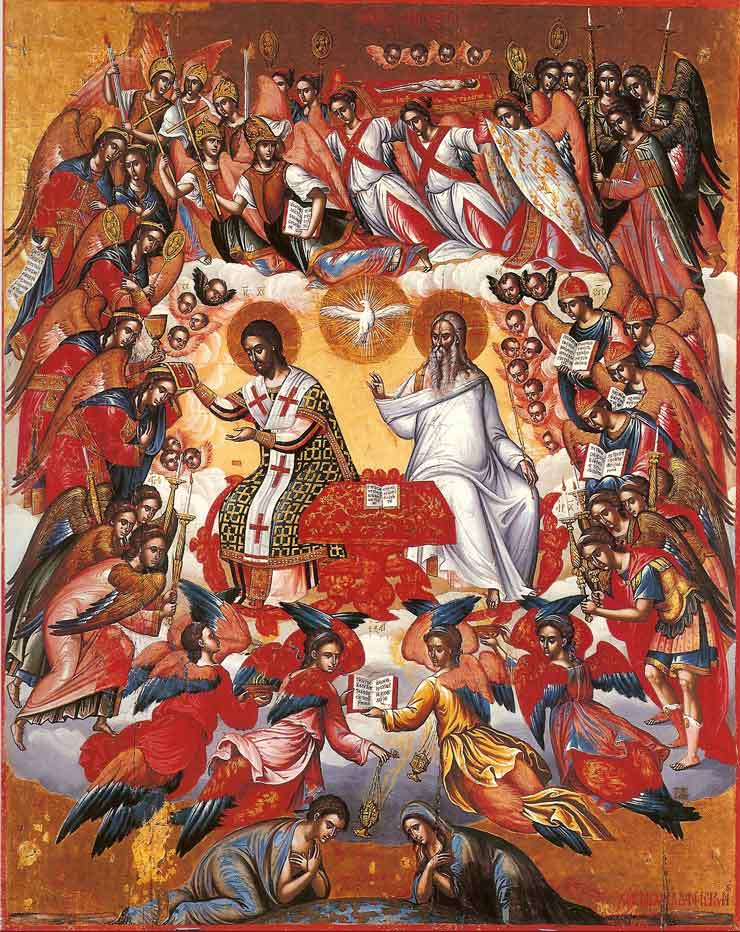
The Divine Liturgy. Michael Damaskinos, 16th century.

- c. 1571–80 The city of Athens contained 17,616 inhabitants, up from 12,633 in the years 1520–30.
- 1573 The Church of San Giorgio dei Greci is completed by the Greek community of Venice, historically the most important church of the Greek Orthodox Diaspora, becoming the ethnic and religious center of Hellenism in the city and broader region of Venice which at its peak numbered 15,000 members.
- 1574–82 Michael Damaskinos, the greatest Cretan icon painter of the day, paints the iconostasis of the Church of San Giorgio dei Greci in Venice.
- 1575 The Patriarchate of Constantinople granted Mount Sinai autonomous status.
- 1576–1581 Correspondence between Patr. Jeremias II and the Lutheran professors at Tübingen.
- 1576 Pope Gregory XIII establishes Pontifical Greek College of St. Athanasius (popularly known as the 'Greek College') in Rome, which he charged with educating Italo-Byzantine clerics. (Note: "Though most of the students came from Catholic families in the Aegean Islands, the Jesuits at Constantinople were able to persuade some Orthodox parents there to send their sons to it. Not all of them were converted to Catholicism in the course of their studies; but almost all of them returned with a kindlier feeling towards Rome and a readiness to work for some sort of union.")
- 1577 Metr. Gabriel Severus of Philadelphia was appointed to the new Orthodox Archbishopric (1578) centered in Venice at the Church of San Giorgio dei Greci, remaining as shepherd there for forty years (1577–1616). (Note: He was elected as the Metropolitan of Philadelphia in July 1577, however he never went to his see, but went to Venice instead to oversee the Greek community there.)
- 1579 Death of Gerasimos of Cephalonia, the new ascetic.
- 1580 It was believed that on Great and Holy Saturday, the Holy Fire miraculously shot out of one of three stone columns at the entrance of the Church of the Holy Sepulchre in Jerusalem, splitting and charring the column, and lighting the candles held by the Greek Orthodox Patriarch of Jerusalem Sophronius IV who was standing nearby, having not descended for the heterodox Armenian Patriarch who had attempted to obtain it inside the church; (Note: "To this day, the local Arab Orthodox Christians commemorate this event with a tumultuous procession, proclaiming the victory of their religion over those who would have stolen the Holy Fire from its rightful custodians.") there were 15,000 Greeks living in Venice.

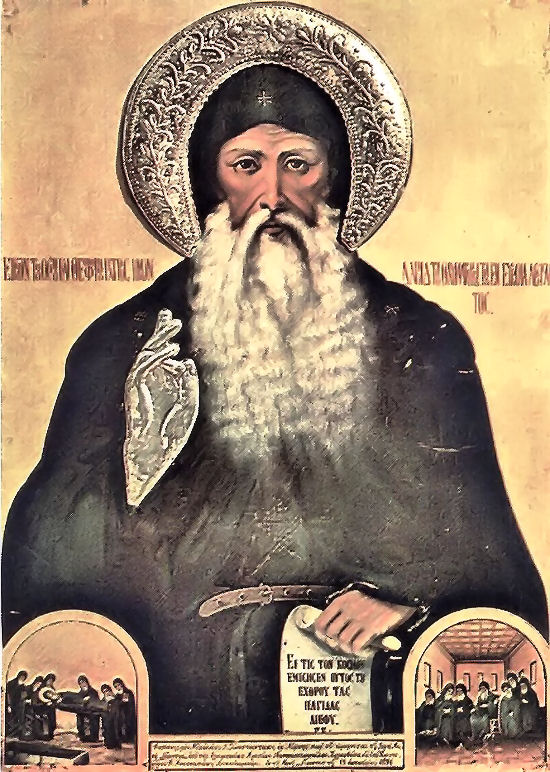
Venerable David of Euboea, Wonderworker († c. 1589).

- 1583 Sigillion of 1583 issued against Gregorian Calendar by council convened in Constantinople; (Note: "As Catholic and Protestant theology increasingly came to exert an influence in the East, the Orthodox response, more often than not, was to reject these "foreign" beliefs and those Christians who erroneously accepted them as orthodox. In 1583, only two years after his last exchange with the Tübingen theologians, Patriarch Jeremiah issued a Sigillion (signed also by Sylvester of Alexandria and Sophronius of Jerusalem) formally repudiating "the newly invested Paschalion and Menologion of the Pope's atheist astronomers" (i.e., the Gregorian calendar), condemning any as "rotten members" who accepted the various teachings and practices of the Roman Church.") arrival of the first Jesuits in Constantinople.
- 1587 The Greek Orthodox Patriarchal Church (Patrik Kilisesi) in Constantinople – the Church of Theotokos Pammakaristos, was seized by the Ottoman authorities and converted into a mosque. (Note: "This dramatic action was echoed in the provinces, where Ottoman governors sought to imitate the example of Istanbul and apply it to Christian churches located within their respective jurisdictions. Worried about the grave implications that this kind of action would have for Muslim-Christian relations in the Ottoman empire as a whole, the Ottoman Sultan, in a firman of 4 October 1587, warned his representatives in the provinces to refrain from fulfilling their aims.")
- 1589 Patr. Jeremias II of Constantinople raises Metr. Job of Moscow to the rank of Patriarch of Moscow and of All Russia, recognizing the autocephaly and canonical territory of Church of Russia; (Note: "Greek Orthodox Christianity remained virtually untouched by the forces unleashed by the Reformation, despite the fact that Lutherans and Calvinists as well as Roman Catholics occasionally made overtures to its religious and political leaders. Of much greater significance to Eastern European Christianity than the Reformation was the establishment of the independence of the Russian Church by the creation of the patriarchy of Moscow in 1589 and the subsequent shifting of the center of gravity of Greek Orthodoxy from Constantinople to Moscow.") death of Philothei of Athens.
- c. 1589 Death of Venerable David of Euboea, Wonderworker and founder in 1540 of the Monastery of Venerable Father David, dedicated to the Transfiguration of the Savior.
- 1590 Death of Timothy of Oropos, founder of the monastery of the Dormition of the Virgin Mary on the Penteliko Mountain (Athens).
- 1591 The Church of the Rotonda in Thessaloniki (Church of Agios Georgios), founded in 306 AD, is converted into an Ottoman mosque.
- 1593 The termination of the authority of the Protos, as the supreme administrative and spiritual leader of the Athonite monks, and the establishment of the "Megali Synaxis" (The Great Council) at Kariai, as the supreme authority in charge of all affairs concerning the monastic community of Mount Athos.
- 1595 Pope Clement VIII declared in his Constitution Magnus Dominus (23 December 1595), which announced the Union of Brest, that Orthodox Chrism was not valid and had to be repeated by a Roman Catholic bishop and that all Orthodox clergy had to accept the union; (Note: The document shows that membership in the Church of God was seen as essentially conditioned by communion with the Pope of Rome. Those who do not belong to the Roman-Catholic Church cannot be saved because they are not members of the Church of God as such. Membership in the Roman Catholic Church was thus thought of as the only possible way of attaining salvation.) in Italy, the Greek language was forbidden in the liturgy and the College of St Athanasius (formally established in Rome in 1581) became one of the main centres of anti-Eastern Orthodox propaganda; this Pope also replaced all Orthodox bishops with his own people, a policy that alienated local populations, who yearned for the religious tolerance enjoyed by Ottoman subjects.
- 1601 New Hieromartyr Seraphim, Bishop of Phanarion and Neokhorion.
- From 1601. The relatively modest Church of St George in the Phanar district of Istanbul becomes the seat of the Ecumenical Patriarchate.
- 1602 Death of Seraphim of Lebadeia.
- 1622 The Patriarchal School (Great School of the Nation) was entrusted to the Athenian Neo-Aristotelian scholar and gifted teacher Theophilos Korydalleus, who directed it with absences until 1640, becoming the leader of the philosophical school which was to predominate for the next two hundred years. (Note: According to K. Th. Dimaras: "For nearly two hundred years Korydallism was the basis of modern Hellenism's philosophical education. His works were considered a great improvement on the Byzantine handbooks which had preceded them. He was universally praised; his works filled every Greek library. Important scholars summarized them, commented on them, and translated them. But as Moisiodax observed, they are in the strictest scholastic tradition and ultimately hindered the development of learning in Greece." A secular Hellenic rational spirit had been cultivated for some time by some eminent Greeks, among whom Theophilos Korydalleus (1563–1646) is considered as a precursor of free thought in modern Greece. But the most prominent amongst them, by common acknowledgement, was Adamantios Korais (1743–1833).)
- 1624 Death of Dionysius of Zakynthos.

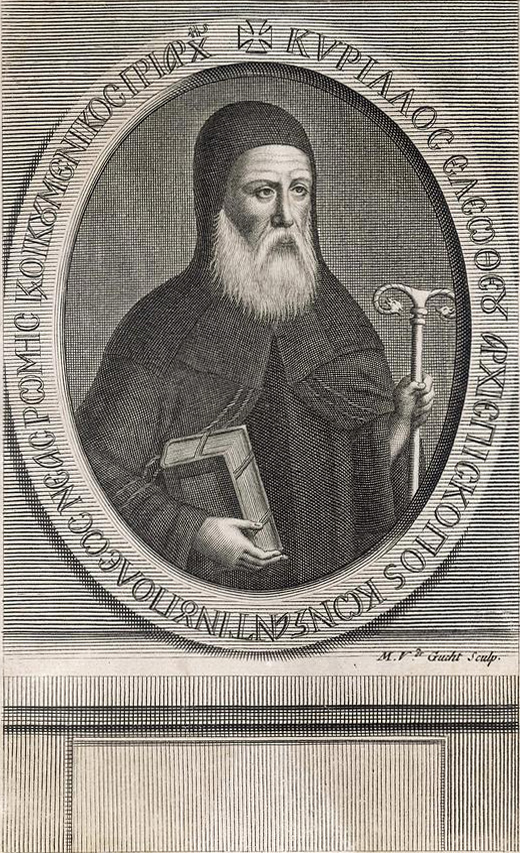
Hieromartyr Cyril Loukaris (†1638), Abp. of Constantinople and New Rome. (Note: Hieromartyr Cyril Lucaris (†1638) was honoured as a Saint and Martyr shortly after his martyric death, and the Venerable Saint Eugenios of Aitolia (†1682, 5 August) compiled an Akolouthia (service) to celebrate his memory. The official glorification of Hieromartyr Cyril Loukaris took place by decision of the Holy Synod of the Patriarchate of Alexandria on 6 October 2009, and his memory is commemorated on 27 June.)

- 1625 Confession of Faith by Metrophanes Kritopoulos written, while he was a student at the University of Helmstedt in Germany. (Note: Kritopoulos' Confession is more of a theological treatise than a brief credal statement. He discusses at some length the points on which Catholics and Protestants differed – in theology as well as practice – from the tradition of the undivided Church. Often referring to the Church Fathers and Ecumenical Councils, he nevertheless accepts certain Protestant teachings such as the acknowledgement of three sacraments, the remaining four becoming "sacramental rites". Certainly Kritopoulos' is the most Orthodox of the four 17th-century Confessions (i.e. Metrophanes Kritopoulos (1625); Cyril Loukaris (1629); Peter Mogila (1645); and Dositheos of Jerusalem (1672)).)
- 1627 Hieromonk Nicodemos Metaxas (1585–1646) founded the first Greek printing press in Constantinople, becoming involved in printing refutations of Roman Catholic theology, since the Roman Catholic campaign for the conversion of the Greeks was then at a great activity. (Note: "In 1627 a wealthy monk and patriot called Nikodemos Metaxas (1585–1646) carried his printing press on a British merchant vessel from London to Kyrillos Loukaris, in Constantinople. Under a surety provided by the British Ambassador to the Turkish authorities, Nikodemos reprinted an essay by Patriarch Loukaris against Jewish dogma. One of the first books printed by a Greek in Greece, it included sermons by Maximos Margounios. The second book from his printery contained a series of anti-Papist tracts, which gave rise to a Jesuit plot that nearly cost his life.")
- 1629 Confession of Cyril Lucaris is published under his name in Geneva (Lucarian Confession), being Calvinistic in doctrine, composed by Calvinist theologians who submitted their draft to the Patriarch for his signature in order to promulgate their novel doctrines. (Note: According to Greek theologian Professor John N. Karmiris, "the Confession was composed in Geneva by Calvinist theologians working under Diodat and then adapted and reshaped in a more Orthodox manner in Constantinople by the Calvinist theologian Anthony Leger and the Patriarch Cyril Loukaris himself. The patriarch claimed authorship under Protestant pressure in view of the many dangers surrounding him. The Calvinists submitted their draft of the Confession to the patriarch and demanded his signature in recompense for the great services they had rendered him.")
- 1638 First translation into Modern Greek of the New Testament, by the Greek hieromonk Maximos Rodios of Gallipoli (Kallioupolitis); martyrdom of Patr. Cyril Loukaris, one of the most important personalities of the Turkish period, (Note: "In the bold policy of this Patriarch...we find mixed and mingled many of the conflicting trends which distracted the Greek community of the seventeenth century with a multitude of warring influences – conservatism against reform; Orthodox mysticism against the materialistic rationalism of the West; traditional Byzantinism against the emerging spirit of the new Greece. Buffeted between the Ottoman authorities on the one side and the Western powers on the other, battling against the infiltration of Roman Catholicism, Cyril Loukaris gave his own original reply to the problem of relations between Orthodoxy and Western Christianity. In doing so he "crystallized and translated into action the confused aspirations of a Greece which was just beginning to collect its thoughts with a view to making contact with Western civilization." His attempted reform of the clergy, his introduction of a calendar dated from the Nativity of Christ in place of the old Byzantine chronology dated from the Creation, the establishment by Nicodemus Metaxas, at Constantinople, of the first Greek press in the East (1627), the translation of the New Testament into popular Greek (Geneva, 1638) "are works of mark, witnessing to the breadth of view and the bold initiative of this great reformer".") though controversial, martyred by the Ottoman Turks at the instigation of the Roman Catholic Church via the religious and political influence of the Jesuits and Capuchins of Constantinople, and the French and Austrian ambassadors. (Note: "The Catholic Church used all its religious and political influence to destroy this "son of darkness": the Jesuits and Capuchins of Constantinople, the French and Austrian ambassadors, the newly constituted Propaganda Fidei, Pope Urban VIII himself and even Louis XIII and the powerful Cardinal Richelieu. Almost any means of attacking Loukaris were regarded as legitimate because the motive was "sacred": these included threats and violence, bribing Turkish officials and pro-Catholic clerics in the circle of his successor Cyril Kontares, forging texts incriminating Loukaris, and claiming that the patriarch was inciting foreign powers against the Ottoman Empire. The Austrian Embassy planned Loukaris' assassination or his abduction to Italy and delivered to the Holy Inquisition. Eventually the Austrian ambassador and Kontares persuaded the Sublime Porte to eliminate the patriarch and he was strangled on 27 June, 1638.") (Note: "Despite Western references to Patriarch Kyrillos' wide contacts with the Reformers, he is in fact most famous in the Orthodox world for his anti-Papist stand against the Uniate menace and for his opposition to Jesuit missions in Eastern Europe. His contacts in Eastern Europe, where he studied, served, and traveled, were extensive. His opposition to Uniate Catholicism after the Brzeesc-Litewski Treaty of 1596 was so strong and widespread, that his so-called "Confession," whatever its true source, is a mere footnote to his struggle against Papism. It was THIS anti-Latin Loukaris who supported Protestant opposition to Papism, who perhaps allowed his views to be restated and published by his Calvinist contacts in Geneva, and who earned the enduring hatred of the Papacy, which has played an essential role – if one reads the intellectual history surrounding this issue – in perpetuating the idea that the "Confessio" was the direct work of Kyrillos and that he was a Protestant in his thinking.) (Note: "Στις 27 Ιουνίου του 1638 Λατίνοι και εβραίοι εξαγόρασαν με 4.000 τάλληρα τον Μέγα Βεζύρη Βαϊράμ Πασά και με διαταγή του συνελήφθη και εξετελέσθη ο Κύριλλος Λούκαρις με την κατηγορία ότι προπαρασκεύαζε εθνική επανάσταση των Ελλήνων με την βοήθεια των Ορθοδόξων Κοζάκων.")
- 1647 Conversion to Islam of the Metropolitan of Rhodes Meletios, who under the name of Aslan occupied a high post in the Ottoman Court hierarchy, but was executed by the Ottomans in 1661. (Note: "But against these instances of infidelity in high places the Greek Church could set many martyrs from the humbler ranks of society, known in the calendar as Neo-Martyrs, among them men who had voluntarily or involuntarily accepted Islam, often in childhood, but who subsequently recanted at the cost of their lives and deliberately sought death by public confession.")
- 1650–1700 Ottoman Constantinople is largest city in the world by population.
- 1651 Death of Nilus the Myrrh-gusher of Mt. Athos.
- 1657 New Hieromartyr Parthenius III, Patriarch of Constantinople.
- 1662 The Patriarchal School (Great School of the Nation) acquired permanent income, a building and remarkable teachers, among them Alexandros Mavrokordatos who bore the title Confidant.
- 1669 Greek island of Crete taken by Ottoman Empire from Venetians; (Note: "During and after the Cretan War, voluntary conversion to Islam resulted in the formation of an important Muslim community on the island, which nonetheless continued to be dominated by the Orthodox Christian majority.") martyrdom of John Naukliros ("the Navigator", "the Skipper"), burned alive on Kos.

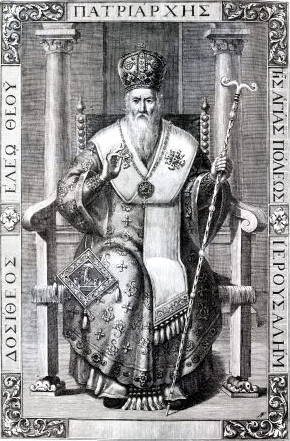
Patr. Dositheos Notaras who convened the Synod of Jerusalem.

- 1672 Synod of Jerusalem convened by Greek Orthodox Patriarch of Jerusalem Dositheos Notaras, refuting article by article the Calvinistic confession attributed to Hieromartyr Cyril Lucaris, defining Orthodoxy relative to Roman Catholicism and Protestantism, and defining the Orthodox Biblical canon; the acts of this council are later signed by all five patriarchates (including Russia).
- 1673 Death of Panagiotis Nikousios, the first Greek Grand Dragoman, exercising great influence on the foreign policy of the Ottoman Empire, and being a great benefactor to the Greek nation and Church, including establishing the rights enjoyed by the Greeks over the Church of the Holy Sepulchre. (Note: (in Greek) Ενδιαφέρθηκε πολύ για του Αγίους Τόπους και από τη θέση του μεγάλου διερμηνέα πέτυχε την έκδοση ενός χάτι-σερίφ (φιρμάνι γραμμένο από τον ίδιο τον σουλτάνο) με το οποίο επιδικάζονταν τα ιερά προσκυνήματα στους ορθοδόξους. See: (in Greek): Παναγιώτης Νικούσιος. Βικιπαίδεια. (Greek Wikipedia).)
- 1675 Large scale emigrations of Maniotes to Corsica, first to Paomia, and later to Cargèse, the Greek inhabitants of which speak a special dialect; in an urgent firman issued in late 1675 the Ottoman government made it unequivocally clear that the Church of the Nativity in Bethlehem was an exclusively Christian shrine, and that true Muslims were to keep away from there, either for pilgrimage or for the purpose of disruption; (Note: The firman was accompanied by a formal legal opinion (fatwa) that questioned the authenticity and sanctity of the Nativity site and denounced those Muslims who adored it in vain.) death of Metr. Joseph (Nelyubovich-Tukalsky) of Kiev and all Rus', Exarch of Ukraine and the last Ukrainian metropolitan to recognize the authority of the Ecumenical Patriarchate of Constantinople (thenceforth the see was administered by Moscow with the election in 1685 of Gedeon (Svyatopolk-Chetvertynsky) as the first Metropolitan of Kiev of the Russian Orthodox Church).
- 1676 Abp. Joseph (Georgirenes) of Samos journeyed to London, England, becoming involved in efforts to erect a Greek church there.
- 1677 After appeals by the members of the Greek Community of London to the Privy Council for permission to erect a Greek church, Bp. Henry Compton assigned a site for building the church, which was ready for use by the end of 1677.
- 1680 Female mass suicide of 30-40 young girls from the village of Hazar in the region of Pafra in Western Pontus, who preferred to fall from a fortress (known as the 'fortress of Ali') into a 150-meter precipice, rather than to fall into the hands of the Turkish forces of Hassan Ali Bey, who were on a campaign to capture young girls in order to send them to the slave markets of Anatolia. (Note: In 1680 a large number of women and young girls entered into the fortress of Ali (later called "Kızkalesi" – "Maiden's castle"), in order to escape being taken and enslaved. After being besieged for 48 days, some of them lost their senses, others died of hunger and thirst, and others escaped secretly and surrendered to the forces of the derebey, since they could no longer withstand the hardships. However one group of 30-40 young girls, unwilling to be captured, climbed to the highest summit of the fortress, from where they fell and committed suicide. After these events took place in the region of Pafra, an uprising of a number of courageous Greeks took place who climbed the surrounding mountains and armed themselves, making reprisals on the forces of the derebey, undertaking an unequal but virtuous struggle against the Turkish oppressors. A Greek dance that was danced in Pafra in order to commemorate the 30-40 young girls from the village of Hazar is variously known as the: 'Thanati Laggeman' (Θανατί Λάγγεμαν) – "Death Jump"; or; 'Kizlar Choplamasi' (Κιζλάρ Χοπλαμασί) – which in Turkish means "The Girls' Jump"; or; 'Kizlar Kaïtesi' (Κιζλάρ Καϊτεσί) – "the musical purpose of the girls"; The dance portrays the movements of the girls as they jumped into the void to meet death on the steep and sharp rocks. The musical instruments that were used were the flute (ζουρνάς) with the Davul (νταούλι), and the Lyre (λύρα) to a lesser extent.)
- 1682 Greek church in Soho (London) is closed and the building is leased to French Huguenots.
- 1684 New Hieromartyr Zacharias, Bishop of Corinth.
- 1685–87 Two Greek brothers Ioannikios and Sophronios Likhud, monks from Cephalonia, founded and managed the Slavic Greek Latin Academy, organized as the first higher education establishment in Moscow, on the premises of the Zaikonospassky Monastery, with over 70 students.
- 1688–1715 Venetian Rule of the Peloponnese peninsula. (Note: "In 1685–1687, aided by her Papal and Habsburg allies in the "Holy League" against the Ottoman Empire, Venice conquered all of the Peloponnese except for the rock-fortress of Monemvasia, whose garrison held out until 1690. The Venetians called their vast acquisition the Regno della Morea, i.e., the Kingdom of the Morea. Through it they hoped to revive their once far-flung Levantine empire. The peninsula was expected to replace in strategic and economic importance the great island of Crete, where the Turks had only recently ended the long Venetian dominion (1205–1669).")
- 1687 Parthenon devastated by Venetian shelling.
- 1691 On the recommendation of Grand Vizier Mustafa Köprül, ordinances were issued which bear the collective name Nizam Djedid (the 'New System'), which called upon provincial Governors to act justly towards Christians and not to increase their burden of taxation.
- 1695 New Hieromartyr Romanos of Dominitza (or Diminitsa), Lacedemonia.
- 1699–1705 Greek College is established at Gloucester Hall as a separate college for Greek Orthodox students at Oxford University. (Note: The penultimate Principal of Gloucester Hall, Benjamin Woodruffe, established a 'Greek College' for Greek Orthodox students to come to Oxford, part of a scheme to make ecumenical links with the Church of England. This was active from 1699 to 1705, although only 15 Greeks are recorded as members.)
- c. 1700 By the eighteenth century there were some forty Greek churches in Constantinople, but only three of these had been built before the conquest, including: St. George of the Cypresses in Psamathia (which was destroyed by earthquake early in the century), St. Demetrius Kanavou (which was destroyed by fire a few years later), and St. Mary of the Mongols (which still remains a church today, though it was badly damaged in the anti-Greek riots of 1955).

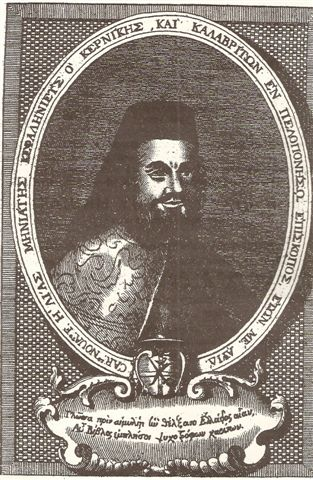
Ilias Miniatis, Greek prelate who was among the most important ecclesiastical orators under Ottoman rule († 1714).

- 1705 A serious revolt against the officers of the child levy took place at Naoussa, when the inhabitants led by an armatolos named Zisis Karademos refused to give up their children and killed the Government officers, however their punishment was harsh, as the rebels were killed or strangled and part of the population was imprisoned. (Note: But this appears to have been the last attempt of the Ottomans to hold the child levy in Greece.)
- 1707 Death of Athanasius the New, Wonderworker of Christianopolis. (Note: The date of his death is also given as 1735.)
- 1711 Death of Bp. Sophianos of Dryinoupolis, Orthodox missionary in Ottoman Epirus.
- 1713 Theological School of Patmos founded by St. Makarios Kalogeras.
- 1714 Death of Ilias Miniatis, Bishop of Kalavryta (since 1710), and an outstanding orator and eloquent preacher of the Greek Church, whose preachings are considered exemplars for modern ecclesiastical rhetoric and one of the earliest formative influences on cultivated modern Greek.
- 1716 Reported Miracle of St. Spyridon, who saves Corfu from Ottoman invasion.
- 1720 Monastery of the Life-Giving Spring (Poros) founded.
- 1722 Council in Constantinople, in which Athanasios of Antioch (died 1724) and Chrysanthos of Jerusalem (1707–1731) participated, decided for the re-baptism of the Latins.

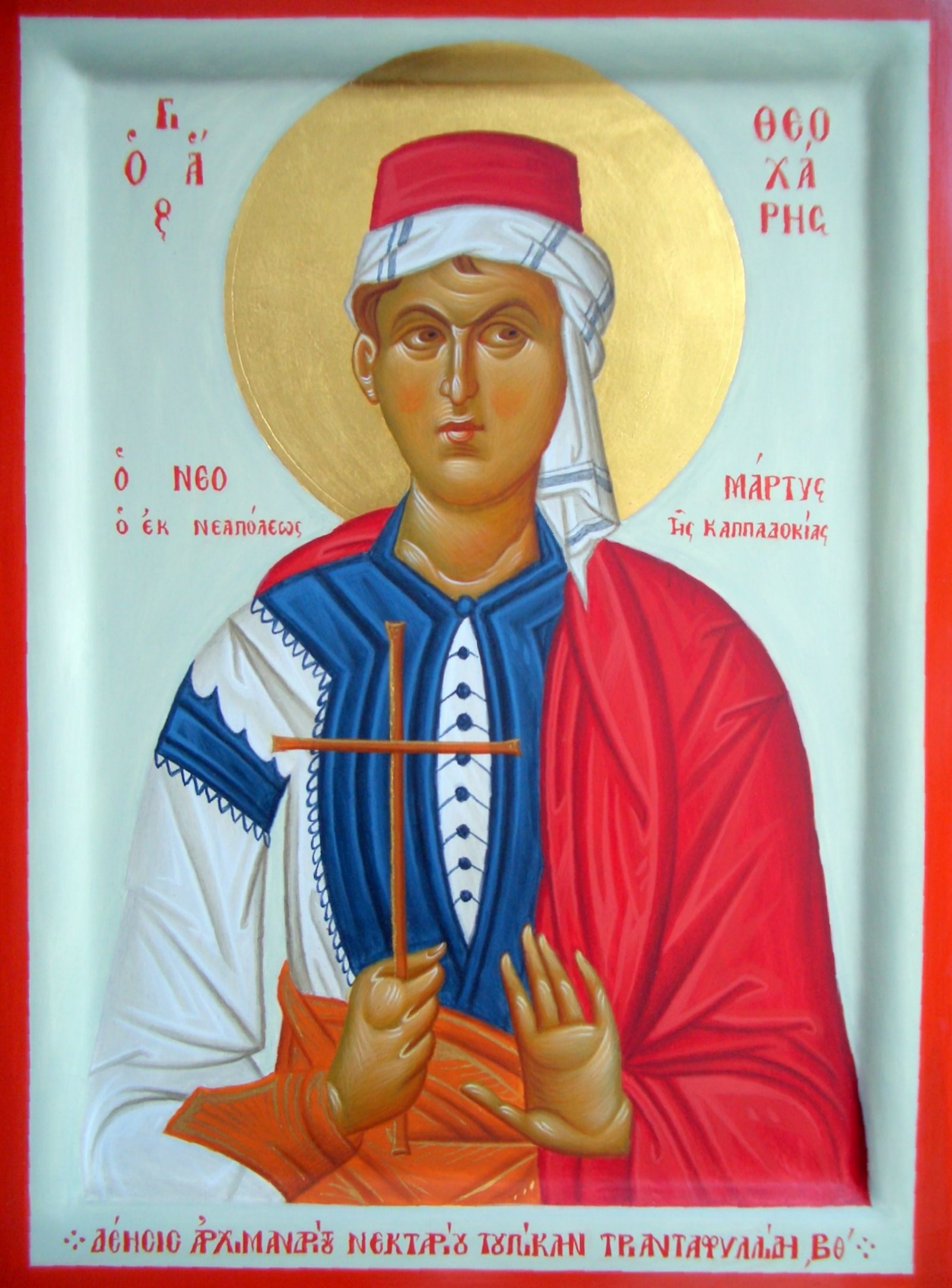
New Martyr Theocharis of Neapolis, Cappadocia († 1740).

- 1728 The Ecumenical Patriarchate formally replaced the Creation Era (AM) calendar, in use for over 1000 years, with the Christian Era (AD).
- 1730 Death of John the Russian.
- 1733 Evangelical School of Smyrna founded. (Note: (in Greek) Αρχικά ξεκίνησε ως ένα μικρό σχολείο με το όνομα "Σχολείο του Χριστού" το 1717 όταν διευθυντής του ήταν ο Ιθακήσιος Ιερόθεος Δενδρινός.)
- 1740 Miracle said to have been performed by John the Baptist on the island of Chios; martyrdom of Theocharis of Neapolis, Cappadocia, for refusing to convert to Islam. (Note: In 1923 his relics were translated to Thessaloniki and were placed in the Church of St. Catherine, Thessaloniki.)
- 1741 Synodal reform initiated, when Metr. Gerasimos of Heraclia obtains a Firman (decree) from Ottoman officials, regulating and subordinating the election of the Patriarch of Constantinople to the five Metropolitans of Heraclia (Heraclea Perinthus), Cyzicus (Kyzikos), Nicomedia, Nicaea, and Chalcedon, creating the so-called "System of the Elders" (Gerontismos, Γεροντισμος), established gradually and in place until the second half of the 19th century. (Note: This system of Elders (Gerontismos) had been introduced in the administration of the Greek Church, by a firman, in the year 1741. Indeed, the Ottoman authority approved the Synodal reform, which led to this system of Gerontismos under which the Church was governed down to the second half of the 19th century. The system of gerontism was abolished after the adoption of the so-called "General" or "National Regulations" by the National Assembly that convened in Constantinople in 1858–1860. This was a result of the proclamation of the Hatt-ı Hümayun (1856), the imperial decree that among others provided for the reorganization of the millet, the ethnic-religious communities of the Ottoman Empire." See also: State organisation of the Ottoman Empire#Provincial governance (civil administration).)
- 1743 New Hieromartyr Anastasios of Ioannina.

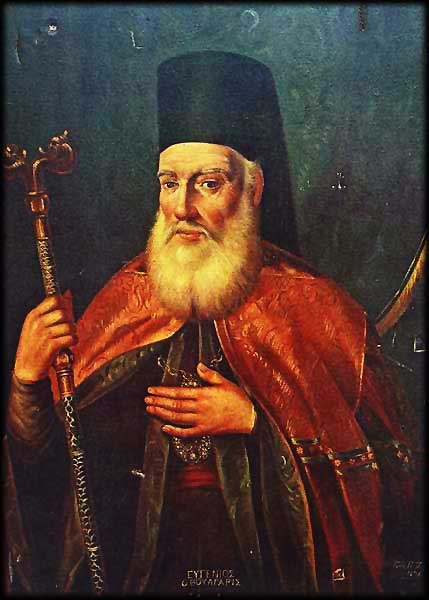
Eugenios Voulgaris, eminent 18th-century theologian, scholar, "Teacher of the Nation", and Archbishop of Cherson, Ukraine.

- 1744 The first masonic lodge opened in Galata in Constantinople in 1744. (Note: Emerging liberalism was strongly connected with the proliferation of freemasonry, leading the Ecumenical Patriarchate to repeatedly condemn the freemasons. In the Ionian islands, Freemasonry was instituted in 1740, while foreign Freemasons existed as early as 1743 in the principalities, and the first Romanian lodge was founded in Jassy in 1772 (Gedeon 1976:104; Georgescu 1971:32 n.3). The fact that both Greek Orthodox and Western merchants were enrolled accelerated the process of acquainting the new Greek Orthodox aristocracy with Western liberalism.)
- 1749 Athonite Ecclesiastical Academy ("Athonite School") is founded on Mount Athos by the brethren of the Monastery of Vatopedion.
- 1751 The monk Theoklitos Poliklidis published a pamphlet (Agathángelos) foretelling the liberation of Christians by a fair-haired people who, at the time, were generally identified as the Russians; (Note: Ieronymos Agathangelos flourished in 1279 AD. He was a priest-monk and confessor, born in Rhodes. He lived in a cenobitic monastery for 51 years. In his 79th year of age he was, as he says, at Messina of Sicily, and at dawn on the Sunday of Orthodoxy he experienced a majestic vision by which several prophecies were foretold him. These were copied by an Italian monk in Messina in 1555, then translated into Latin by Theoklitos Polyidis, who distributed them around northern Europe, and then translated into Modern Greek in 1751 and printed in various editions in Venice.) New Virgin Martyr Kyranna of Thessalonica.
- 1752 Death of philosopher, theologian and lawyer Vikentios Damodos (1700–1752), the first Orthodox to write a theological Dogmatics. (Note: Vikentios Damodos was conscious of the Western-style transformation of Orthodox theology, and sought to differentiate himself from Westerners in his Dogmatics by denouncing their errors, mentioning "false scholastic reasoning" and "the most erroneous and impious doctrines of the Lutherans and Calvinists"; being the only modern Greek theological writer who unequivocally attributes heresies to Augustine. Yet, he remained trapped in the Western theological assumptions which dominated his age. His Dogmatics was based on the Dogmatica Theologica of the French Jesuit, Denys Petau (1583–1652). Certain of his theses were severely critical of Petau, but Damodos retained his themes and analytical method. Even the title Dogmatic Theology, now established in Orthodox theological writing, comes from Petau. Damodos' Dogmatics became the model for all later Orthodox handbooks, such as Eugenios Voulgaris' Theologikon, Athanasios Parios' Epitome (1806), A. Moschopoulos' Epitome of Dogmatic and Moral Theology (1857), and the modern dogmatic works of Zikos Rosis (1903), Christos Androutsos (1907), and Panayiotis Trembelas (1959–1963).)
- 1753–59 Eminent theologian and scholar Eugenios Voulgaris heads the Athonite School, envisaging a revival and upgrading of learning within the Orthodox Church through substantial training in the classics combined with an exposure to modern European philosophy, including Locke, Leibniz and Wolff. (Note: "In 1753 the Greek reformer Eugenius Bulgaris founded the Athonite Academy where students were able to study secular philosophy and science and become exposed to western ideas.")
- 1754 Hesychast Renaissance begins with the Kollyvades Movement, whose leaders included St. Makarios of Corinth, Christophoros of Arta, Agapios of Cyprus, Athanasios of Paros, Neophytos Kausokalyvites, and St. Nicodemus the Hagiorite; (Note: As Bishop Kallistos of Diokleia succinctly points out, throughout the Turkish period the traditions of Hesychasm remained alive, particularly on Mount Athos. Here during the second half of the 18th century there arose an important movement of spiritual renewal, whose effects can still be felt today. Its members, known as the Kollyvades, were alarmed at the way in which all too many of their fellow Greeks were falling under the influence of the Western Enlightenment. The Kollyvades were convinced that a regeneration of the Greek nation would come, not through embracing the secular ideas fashionable in the west, but only through a return to the true roots of Orthodox Christianity – through a rediscovery of Patristic theology and Orthodox liturgical life. In particular, they advocated frequent communion – if possible, daily – although at this time most Orthodox communicated only three or four times a year. For this the Kollyvades were fiercely attacked on the Holy Mountain and elsewhere.) discovery of the holy relics of the "Four Martyrs of Megara": Polyeuctos, George, Adrianos and Platon, the "Newly-Revealed".
- 1755–56 Council of Constantinople, convened and presided over by Ec. Patr. Cyril V, and attended by Patriarchs Matthew (Psaltis) of Alexandria and Parthenius of Jerusalem, and several bishops representing the Orthodox patriarchates, (Note: The acts of this council are also later signed by Patriarch Sylvester of Antioch.), decrees that Western converts must be baptized upon their reception into the Orthodox Church; this council also condemns and anathematizes anyone that dares to change the calendar (Sigillion of 1756 issued against the Gregorian Calendar by Patr. Cyril V of Constantinople).
- 1759 Conservative circles of Mount Athos came out openly against the progressive educational methods of Eugenios Voulgaris, who resigned from the directorship of the Athonite Academy in 1759, and was replaced by Nikolaos Zerzoulis, one of the first proponents of Newtonian science in Greek education.
- 1760 On Pascha, 1760, the inhabitants of 36 villages in the Karamouratades district of Northern Epirus (east of Premeti) apostasized to Islam. (Note: "These later conversions were perhaps due, at least in part, to the unfavorable conditions created in the Balkans by the Russo-Turkish wars of the eighteenth century when the danger of Greek disaffection became more serious as foreign propaganda, and consequent hopes of foreign liberation, grew and Turkish policy was therefore more interested in conversion than it had been.") (Note: (in Greek) "Ας δουμε και μερικες αλλες αλλαξοπιστιες Αρβανιτων. Ανατολικα της Πρεμετης υπαρχουν 36 χωρια που εχουν την κοινη ονομασια Καραμουραταδες. Τα χωρια αυτα υπαγονταν στην επισκοπη Πωγωνιανης και το 1760,βλεποντας τους συμπατριωτες τους μωαμεθανους να καλοπερνουν ενω αυτοι δυστυχουσαν,μηνυσαν στον Επισκοπο πως θα προσευχονταν και θα νηστευαν πιστα ολη τη Σαρακοστη,ωστε να αλλαξει η μοιρα τους.Σε εναντια περιπτωση θα γινονταν μουσουλμανοι.Ο Επισκοπος τους απειλουσε και τους εξορκιζε να μην ασεβουν προς το Θειον,αλλα αυτοι ειχαν παρει τις αποφασεις τους.Τηρησαν σχολαστικα τις νηστειες και τις προσευχες και οταν ηλθε η μερα της Αναστασης και η μοιρα τους δεν ελεγε ν'αλλαξει,εδιωξαν τους Παπαδες και τον Δεσποτη και αλλαξοπιστησαν σχεδον ολοι. Και τα 36 χωρια! Το πατριαρχειο καταθορυβηθηκε και οι Τουρκοι καταχαρηκαν.Μα οι Καραμουρατιωτες,μολις εγιναν μουσουλμανοι και αποχτησαν δικαιωματα ορμησαν στους Τουρκους των κοντινων περιοχων που τοσα χρονια τους καταπιεζαν,και τους περασαν «δια στοματος μαχαιρας»,ωστε να ισοφαρισουν τα δεινα που τους ειχαν αυτοι προξενησει.(Πουκεβιλλ σελ. 206-208,«Voyage en Grece»).")
- 1768 Community of Orthodox Greeks establishes itself in New Smyrna, Florida.

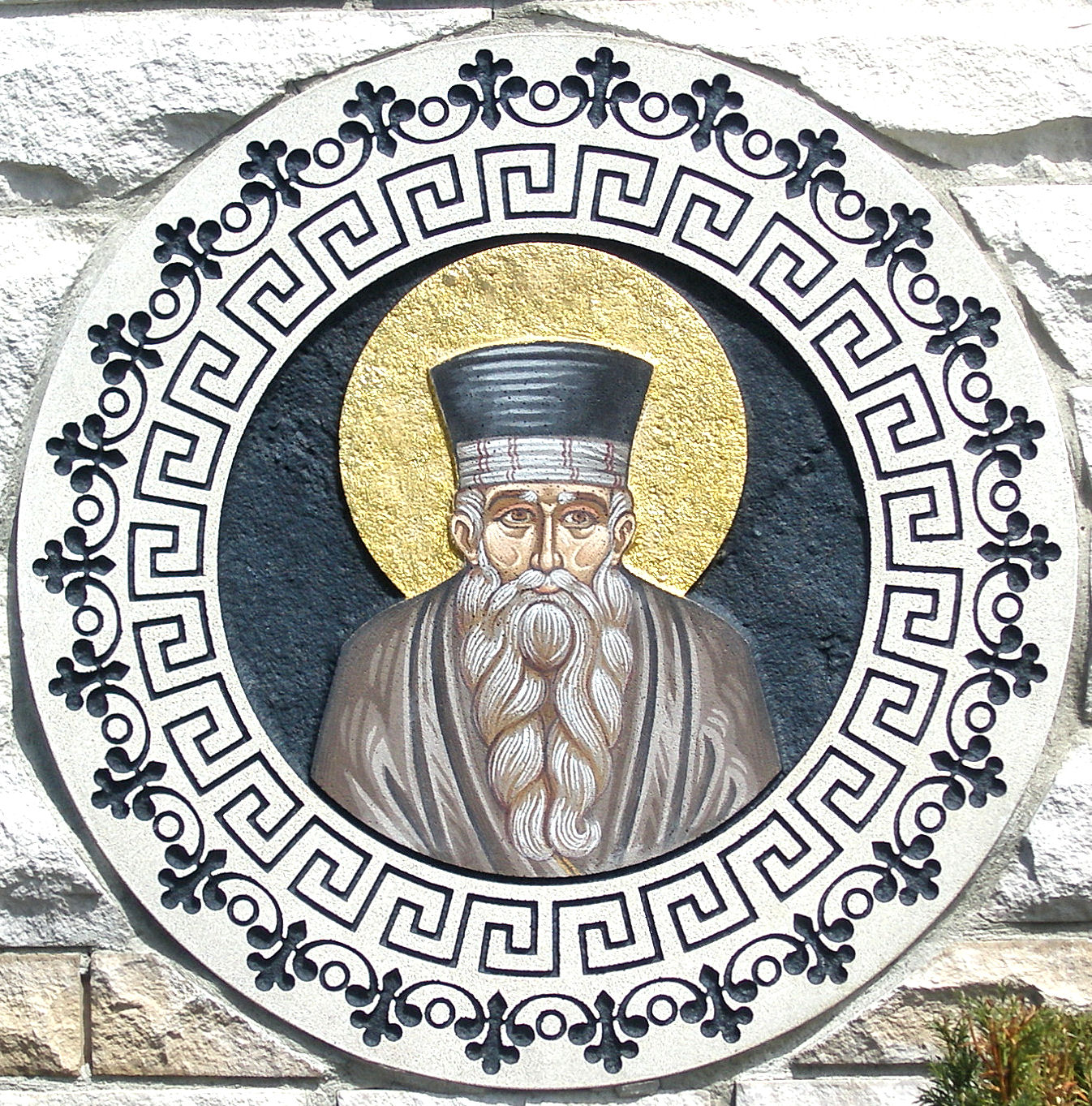
Saint Kosmas Aitolos, New Hieromartyr and Equal to the Apostles († 1779).

- 1770 Greek Rebellion of 1770 (Orlov Events), associated with the Turko-Russian war (1768–74), and considered a prelude to the Greek War of Independence in 1821, saw a failed Greek uprising in the Peloponnese at the instigation of Count Alexei Grigoryevich Orlov; (Note: In early April 1770, only six weeks after the Russian landing, the Turks and their Albanian mercenaries crushingly defeated the Russians and Greeks at Tripoli in the central Peloponnese. From then on the Russians retreated. The Albanian mercenaries of the Turks were totally ruthless in suppressing the revolt, plundering and killing. It is estimated that c. 20,000 Greeks were seized and sold as slaves, and a further 50,000 Greeks (about one sixth of the pre-Revolt population of the Peloponnese) fled to the Ionian Islands, Italy, other parts of Europe and to Russia (especially Crimea and Odesa). It was not until 1779 that the Ottomans were able to restore order in the Peloponnese. From the Russian point of view, Count Orlov's mission was a success, damaging the Turkish Fleet, directing Turkish troops south, and contributing to the victory that led to the signing of the Treaty of Kuchuk-Kainarji. From the Greek point of view, the affair was a failure which cost a huge number of lives, both in battle, and in the Turkish reprisals that followed. The Ottoman government (Divani) proposed a general massacre of the Greeks, regardless of sex and age. All agreed except Admiral Hasan Cezayirli, who finally managed to impose his views with the compelling argument: "If we massacre all the Greeks, who will pay the taxes?") Cretan insurrection against the Ottomans led by Ioannis Daskalogiannis of the Sfakia region is subjugated;
- 1778 On the orders of Catherine II, 18,000 Crimean Greeks, tired of living under Ottoman rule, successfully petitioned the empress for permission to move to Russia, and were allowed to settle on the shores of the Sea of Azov, where they founded the city of Mariupol (Marianopolis); death of Petros Peloponnesios, one of the leading representatives of Post-Byzantine musical tradition and the Lampadarios (leader of the left choir) of the Great Church in the 18th century. (Note: Large parts of the monodic chant sung in several current traditions of Orthodox Chant are transcriptions of his compositions, which he had written down as a teacher of the "New Music School of the Patriarchate".)
- 1779 Death of Kosmas Aitolos, Equal to the Apostles.
- 1782 First publication of Philokalia on Mount Athos, the greatest achievement of the Kollyvades fathers, being an anthology borrowing from thirty-six Church Fathers and ascetics from the 4th to 15th centuries; (Note: In 1793, eleven years after the first Greek edition of 1782, the Philokalia was published in Slavonic translation. The initiative came from the famous monk (St.) Paisius Velichkovsky (1722–1794), abbot of Neamț Monastery in Moldavia, who had spent eighteen years as an ascetic on Mount Athos. The Slavonic translation greatly influenced the Optina Elders.) New Martyr Zacharias of Patra in Morea; the Patriarchate of Constantinople reaffirmed the autonomous status of Mount Sinai. (Note: The only remaining link with the Jerusalem Patriarchate is that the abbot, who is elected by an assembly of senior monks, must be ordained a bishop by the Jerusalem Patriarch, who is also commemorated in the monastery’s liturgy.)
- 1783 The Typikon of the Patriarch Gabriel IV is issued.
- 1788–1808 The Patriarchal School of the Patriarchate of Jerusalem thrived under the pre-eminent scholar James of Patmos (Grk.: Ἰάκωβος ὁ Πάτμιος).
- 1793 Great New Martyr Polydorus of Cyprus.
- 1794 Glorification of Bp. Panaretos of Paphos (†1790) by the Patriarchate of Constantinople; New Martyr Alexander, the former Dervish of Smyrna; Nicodemus of the Holy Mountain first published the Exomologetarion (a guide for confessors), at the press of Nicholas Glykeus of Ioannina in Venice; the city of Odesa is founded by a decree of the Empress Catherine the Great in compliance with the Greek Plan, having been named Odessos (Oδησσός) after the ancient Greek city in the vicinity, (Note: The ancient Greek city of Odessos (Oδησσός) is believed to be the predecessor of the present day city of Varna in Bulgaria; however Odesa is in fact located in the area between the ancient Greek cities of Tyras (Τύρας) and Olbia (Ὀλβία).) and having a population of 3,150, of whom 2,500 were Greeks. (Note: Both Mariupolis and Odesa became important centers for Greek culture and trade, and the Philiki Etairia (the movement that played a major role in the Greek fight for liberation from the Turks) was founded in Odesa.)
- 1795 New Martyr Theodore of Byzantium, at Mytilene.

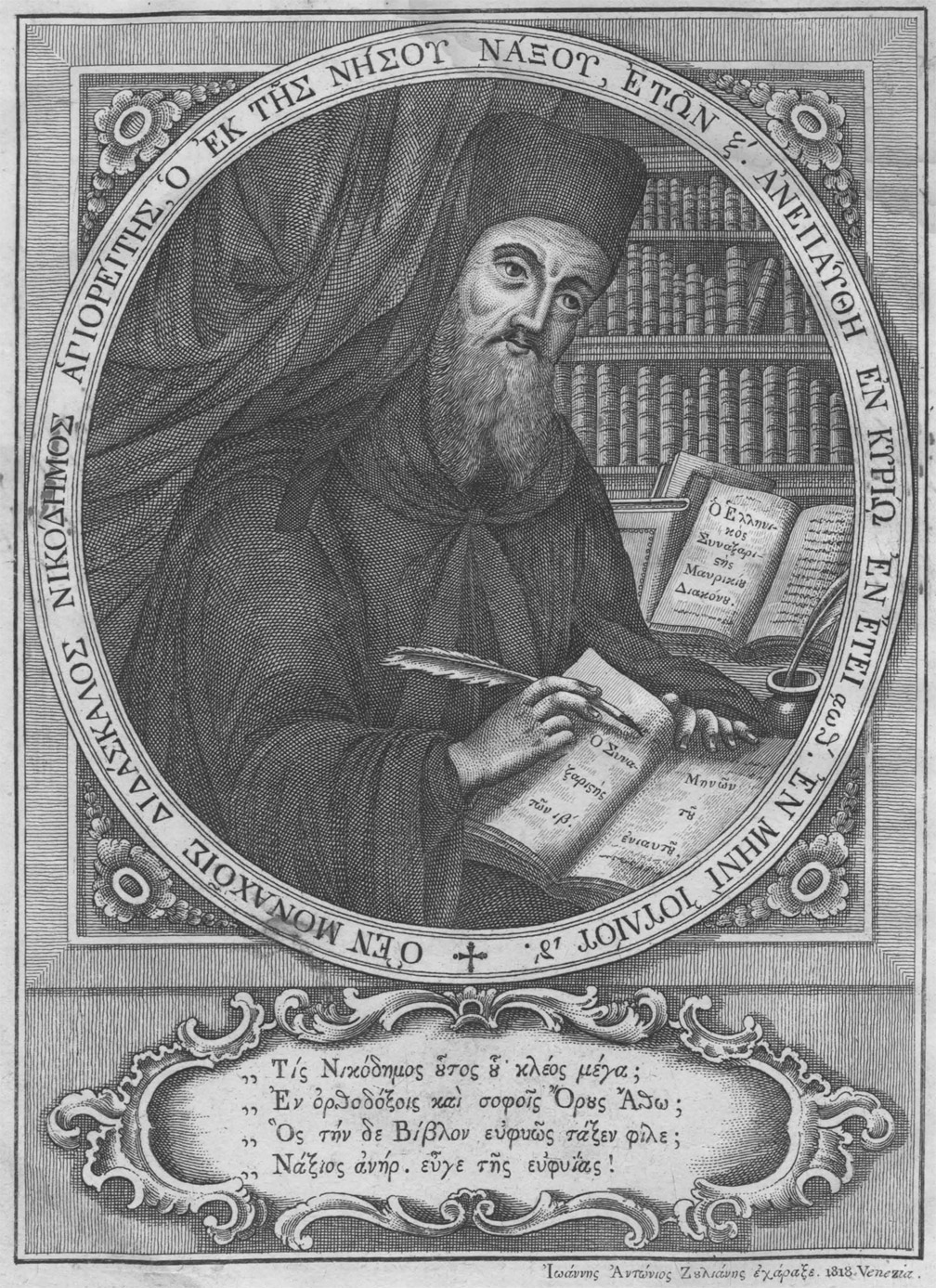
Saint Nicodemus of the Holy Mountain.

- 1796 Nicodemus the Hagiorite publishes Unseen Warfare in Venice; Nikephoros Theotokis publishes the Kyrīakōdromion, a series of commentaries on the Gospel and Epistle readings of the liturgical calendar, an inspired religious text that was also the first to use the katharevousa form of Modern Greek.
- 1797 Hieromartyr George of Neapolis (Nevşehir or Neapolis of Cappadocia).
- 1798 Patriarch Anthimios of Jerusalem stated in the Paternal Teaching (Dhidhaskalia Patriki) that the Ottoman Empire was part of the Divine Dispensation granted by God to protect Orthodoxy from the taint of Roman Catholicism and of Western secularism and irreligion. (Note: The Dhidhaskalia Patriki or Paternal Teaching, attributed to the Patriarch Anthimos of Jerusalem, and published in Istanbul in 1798, described the attitude of the Orthodox hierarchy during the late eighteenth century to the influence of Western ideas in the Greek world. The Dhidhaskalia Patriki has in fact achieved a certain notoriety among historians as one of the more extreme examples of ecclesiastical anti-Westernism, and its significance was not lost on contemporaries.)

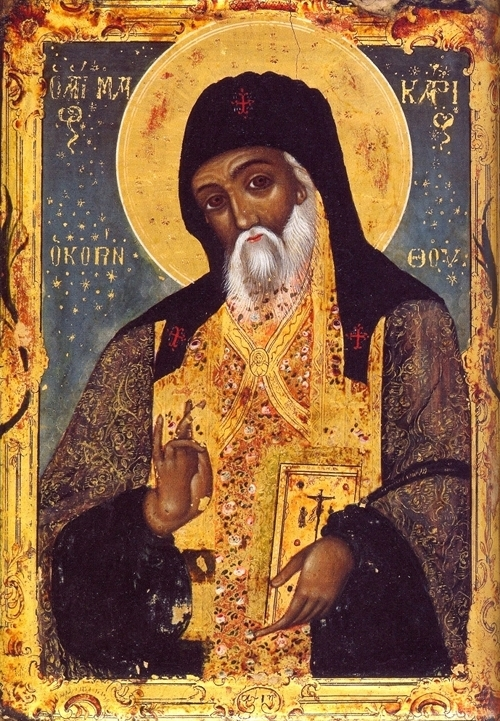
St. Makarios of Corinth.

- 1800 The Rudder (Greek: Πηδάλιον) published and printed in Athens; death of Hieromonk Nikephoros Theotokis, "Teacher of the Nation".
- 1802 New Martyr Luke of Mytilene.
- 1803 Female mass suicide at Zalongo (see also 1680 – female mass suicide in the region of Pafra, Western Pontus).
- 1805 Death of Makarios of Corinth, a central figure in the Kollyvades Movement.
- 1806 Combined persecution of the Klephts of the Morea (Peloponnese), by 1) the Ecumenical Patriarch Kallinikos V who excommunicated them in January, and 2) the Ottoman Sultan Selim III who issued a decree ordering the local population not to provide them shelter or food, to sever all links with them, and report them to the Turkish authorities. (Note: "Deprived of everything and starving, those who survived the catastrophe crossed over to the Ionian Islands. There, new contacts, as well as the growing spirit of nationalism from the French Revolution caused a permutation in their social personality. When the Greek Revolution started in 1821 many of the old chieftains, such as Marco Botsaris, Karaiskakis, Colocotronis, Niketaras, became generals and contributed greatly to important victories of the Greek armies." The Greeks saw the Klephts as heroic avengers of Hellenism, thus romanticizing them. This is evident for example in the 1806 pamphlet Hellenic Nomarchy , written by an anonymous Greek author.)
- 1808 Smyrna Philological Gymnasium founded by Konstantinos Koumas (1777–1836), one of the most distinguished men of the Greek Enlightenment; (Note: See: (in Greek) Κωνσταντίνος Κούμας. Βικιπαίδεια. (Greek Wikipedia).) New Hieromartyr Nicetas of Serres.
- 1809 Death of Nicodemus of the Holy Mountain the "Hagiorite"; death of Hieromartyr Nicetas the Hagiorite.
- 1813 Death of Athanasius Parios, the second leader of the Kollyvades Movement, succeeding Neophytos Kausokalyvites (1713–1784).
- 1814 Martyrdom of Euthymius and Ignatius of Mount Athos.
- 1816 Martyrdom of Acacius of Athos.
- 1819 Council at Constantinople endorses views of Kollyvades fathers. (Note: "In 1819, Patriarch Gregory V wrote to the monks of the Holy Mountain declaring that Communion should not be received at certain set times, but whenever one felt himself ready for it, following confession and other necessary preparation.")

== See also ==
- Social structure of the Ottoman Empire
- List of archbishops of Athens
- Greek Orthodox Church
- Eastern Orthodox Church organization

History

- History of the Eastern Orthodox Church
- History of Eastern Christianity
- History of the Eastern Orthodox Church under the Ottoman Empire
- History of Eastern Orthodox Churches in the 20th century
- Timeline of Eastern Orthodoxy in America

Church Fathers

- Apostolic Fathers
- Church Fathers
- Ante-Nicene Fathers (book)
- Desert Fathers
- Nicene and Post-Nicene Fathers
- List of Church Fathers

== Bibliography ==
- Apostolos E. Vacalopoulos. The Greek Nation, 1453–1669: The Cultural and Economic Background of Modern Greek Society. Transl. from Greek. Rutgers University Press, 1975.

(One of the few scholarly studies in English of this period)

- Christos Yannaras. Orthodoxy and the West: Hellenic Self-Identity in the Modern Age. Transl. Peter Chamberas and Norman Russell. Brookline: Holy Cross Orthodox Press, 2006. ISBN 1-885652-81-X
- Christopher Livanos. Greek Tradition and Latin Influence in the Work of George Scholarios: Alone Against All of Europe. Gorgias Press LLC, 2006. 152 pp. ISBN 9781593333447
- Fr. Nomikos Michael Vaporis. Witnesses for Christ: Orthodox Christian Neomartyrs of the Ottoman Period 1437–1860. St Vladimir's Seminary Press, 2000. 377pp.
- F. W. Hasluck. Christianity and Islam Under the Sultans, Vol. I. Oxford: Clarendon Press, 1929. 877 pp.
- F. W. Hasluck. Christianity and Islam Under the Sultans, Vol. II. Oxford: Clarendon Press, 1929. 877 pp.
- George P. Henderson. The Revival of Greek Thought, 1620–1830. State University of New York Press, 1970.

(Focuses on the intellectual revival preceding the War of Independence in 1821)

- George A. Maloney, (S.J.). A History of Orthodox Theology Since 1453. Norland Publishing, Massachusetts, 1976.
- Gerasimos Augustinos (Prof.). The Greeks of Asia Minor: Confession, Community, and Ethnicity in the Nineteenth Century. Kent State University Press, 1992. 270 pp. ISBN 9780873384599
- Ioannis N. Grigoriadis. Instilling Religion in Greek and Turkish Nationalism: A "Sacred Synthesis". Palgrave Pivot. Springer, 2012. 249 pp. ISBN 9781137301208
- John Christos Alexander. Brigandage and Public Order in the Morea, 1685–1806. Imago, 1985. 169 pp.
- Leften S. Stavrianos. The Balkans Since 1453. Rinehart & Company, New York, 1958.
- (in Latin) Martin Crusius (1526–1607). Turcograecia. 1584.
- Speros Vryonis, (Jr). "Byzantine Attitudes towards Islam during the Late Middle Ages." Greek Roman and Byzantine Studies 12 (1971).
- Speros Vryonis, (Jr). The Decline of Medieval Hellenism in Asia Minor and the Process of Islamization from the Eleventh through the Fifteenth Century. University of California Press, Berkeley and Los Angeles, 1971.

(Very comprehensive, masterpiece of scholarship)

- Steven Runciman. The Great Church in Captivity: A Study of the Patriarchate of Constantinople from the Eve of the Turkish Conquest to the Greek War of Independence. Cambridge University Press,1986.
- Theodore H. Papadopoulos. Studies and Documents Relating to the History of the Greek Church and People Under Turkish Domination. 2nd ed. Variorum, Hampshire, Great Britain, 1990.

(Scholarly, includes source texts in Greek)

- Victor Roudometof. From Rum Millet to Greek Nation: Enlightenment, Secularization, and National Identity in Ottoman Balkan Society, 1453–1821. Journal of Modern Greek Studies, Volume 16, 1998. pp. 11–48.
- Siecienski, Anthony Edward (2010). The Filioque: History of a Doctrinal Controversy. Oxford University Press. ISBN 9780195372045.

Articles
- Elizabeth A. Zachariadou. The Great Church in captivity 1453–1586. Eastern Christianity. Ed. Michael Angold. Cambridge University Press, 2006. Cambridge Histories Online.
- Elizabeth A. Zachariadou. Mount Athos and the Ottomans c. 1350–1550. Eastern Christianity. Ed. Michael Angold. Cambridge University Press, 2006. Cambridge Histories Online.
- I. K. Hassiotis. From the 'Refledging' to the 'Illumination of the Nation': Aspects of Political Ideology in the Greek Church Under Ottoman Domination. Balkan Studies 1999 40(1): 41–55.
- Socrates D. Petmezas. Christian Communities in Eighteenth and Early Nineteenth Century Ottoman Greece: Their Fiscal Functions. Princeton Papers: Interdisciplinary Journal of Middle Eastern Studies 2005 12: 71–127.
