= Aghazade =

Aghazade is a surname. Notable people with the surname include:

- Abbas Aghazade (born 1999), Azerbaijani footballer
- Farhad Aghazade (1880–1931), Azerbaijani teacher
