= Rana Ismayilova =

Azerbaijani organ player

Rana Ismayilova Rəna İsmayılova
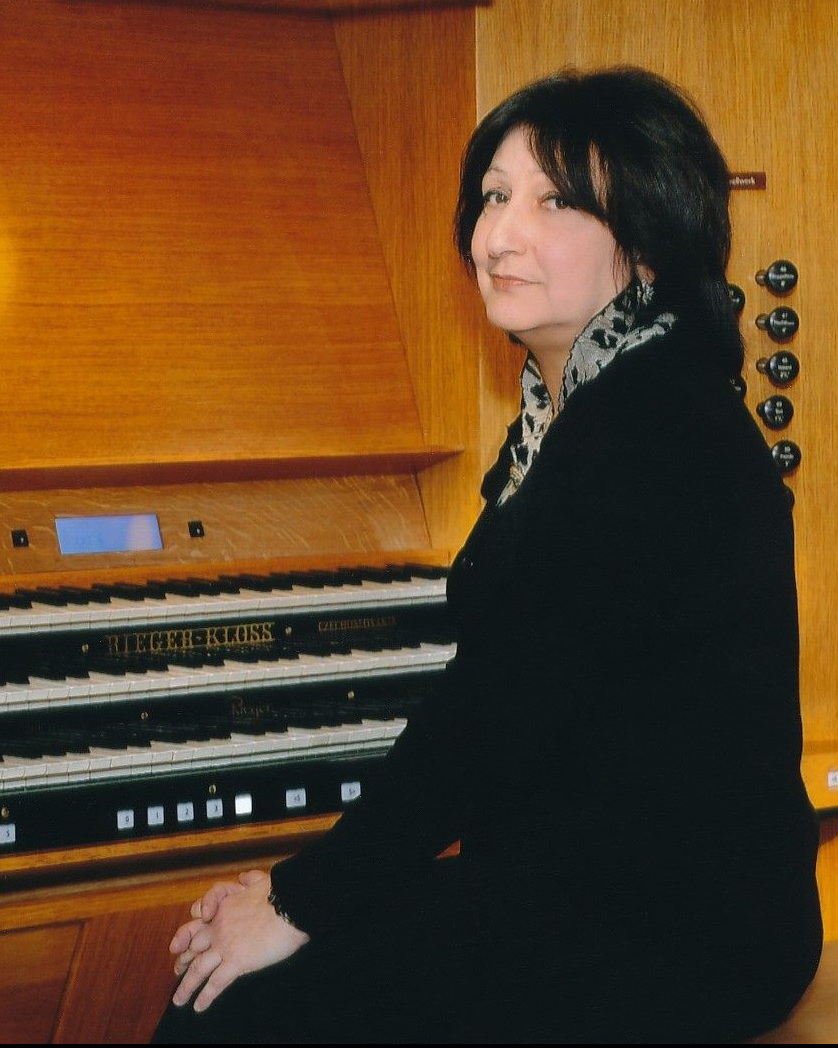

Background information
- Born: August 28, 1950 (age 76); Baku, Azerbaijan SSR, USSR
- Occupation: musician
- Instrument: organ
- Parent(s): Najafgulu Ismayilov; Gullu Mustafayeva
- Awards: Honored Artist of the Republic of Azerbaijan

Rana Najafgulu gizi Ismayilova (Azerbaijani: Rəna Nəcəfqulu qızı İsmayılova, born August 27, 1950) is an organist and Honored Artist of the Republic of Azerbaijan.

== Biography ==
Rana Ismayilova was born on August 28, 1950, in Baku. Her first music teacher was her sister Zemfira Gafarova. After graduating from the Secondary Music School named after Bulbul with a degree in piano, in 1968 she entered the Faculty of history-theory of the Azerbaijan State Conservatoire. Starting from the first year of her education here, she began to play the organ along with the piano, and in the third year she changed her faculty and continued her activity on the piano. She graduated in 1974 with a degree in piano and organ. After graduating, she started working at the Musical Comedy Theater and Sumgayit Music College. Rana Ismayilova, who first worked as a pianist-concertmaster at the Azerbaijan State Conservatory since 1977, entered the assistantship of the Moscow State Tchaikovsky Conservatory in 1983 and continued her education here for 3 years. Here she took lessons from Professor Leonid Roisman.

For the first time since 1987, a two-volume collection of notes entitled "Organ music of Azerbaijani composers" was published under the editorship of Rana Ismayilova, who first worked as a senior teacher and then as an associate professor at the "Organ and harpsichord" department of the Azerbaijan State Conservatoire.

Rana Ismayilova currently lives in Germany. She has repeatedly given official concerts here and performed in churches. She was also the organizer and participant of German, Finnish, Norwegian, French, English music evenings, a series of concerts "Organ yesterday and today".

Rana Ismayilova is married to Fariz Najafov, grandson of Aliafsar Najafov, secretary of the chancellery office of the Council of Ministers of Azerbaijan Democratic Republic (1918-1920).

== Awards ==
- Honored Artist of the Republic of Azerbaijan – October 28, 2000
