= Olga Papasarandou =

Greek Eastern Orthodox nun, nurse and missionary

- Όλγα Παπασαράντου
- Born: 1904; Roino
- Died: 19 August 1996 (aged 91–92)
- Occupation: Christian nun, missionary

Olga Papasarandou (in Greek: Όλγα Παπασαράντου (Ólga Papasarándou)) (1904 in Roino-19 August 1996, in Athens) was a Greek Eastern Orthodox nun, nurse, and missionary who pursued a missionary career in Katanga, in the Democratic Republic of the Congo (DRC).

Sometimes referred to as the "Orthodox Mother Teresa", she was one of the first modern Orthodox missionaries. She played a significant role in the establishment of the Eastern Orthodox community in the Democratic Republic of the Congo and in the missions of the Patriarchate of Alexandria. Buried in a monastery in Megara, her remains were transferred to Kananga in 2005 at the request of the local Eastern Orthodox community.

== Biography ==
Olga Papasarandou was born in Roino, Greece, in 1904. Her parents were devout Eastern Orthodox Christians, but she lost her mother at an early age and had to take on household responsibilities in her place. As a result, she left school early and, at the age of 15, moved to Piraeus to help her brother.

In 1939, when her uncle, Ioannis Papasarandos, was elected Metropolitan of Argolis, she followed him to Nafplio and learned to live an ascetic life under his guidance. He reportedly preferred to distribute leftover food to the poor, which deeply inspired her. After his death, she returned to Athens to care for her elderly and sick father, who had become blind, until his death.

In 1945, she began working in healthcare and served at the Saint Sabbas the Sanctified Hospital in Athens, specializing in oncology. She started as an assistant but gradually climbed the ranks to become the head nurse of the operating room. She remained in this position for twenty-five years, until 1970.

In 1970, her uncle, Archimandrite Chrysostomos Papasarantopoulos, invited her to join him in Kananga, where he had just founded the first Eastern Orthodox community. After a period of hesitation and prayer, she decided to accept the call and joined him. In his notes, her uncle described her as "Sister Olga: Ascetic – Missionary". She assisted him in organizing the first group of Eastern Orthodox faithful and remained by his side until his death in 1972. At that point, she was the only Eastern Orthodox nun and ecclesiastical figure in the Democratic Republic of the Congo, and she resolved not to abandon the local community. She decided to return to Greece to find a priest who could accompany her back to Katanga. This led her to Father Chariton Pnevmatitakis in Patras, whom she persuaded to join her in continuing the mission. He later described their encounter and spoke of Papasarandou in these terms:

God used her as His chosen vessel to convey the call and invitation for me to go to Kananga. When I arrived there in 1973, faced with numerous problems and difficulties, Sister Olga was the first to come to my aid, offering her support for the missionary work.

She returned to Athens for surgery after fracturing her leg in 1995, at the age of 89. She died there the following year, on 19 August 1996. Olga Papasarandou was then buried at the Monastery of Saint John the Baptist in Megara.

=== Legacy ===
Her remains were transferred to Kananga in 2005 at the request of the local Eastern Orthodox community. In August 2017, the Church of Greece, a missionary association, and the Greek state collaborated to erect a bust of Papasarandou in the central square of her birthplace, Roino.

In 2012 and 2019, Theodore II of Alexandria visited her grave. She is sometimes referred to as the "Orthodox Mother Teresa". In 2023, during the commemoration of the founders of the Eastern Orthodox Church in Congo, a disciple of Chariton Pnevmatitakis described her as a "deaconess with pierced hands" and compared her to the myrrh-bearers.

She and her collaborators are generally regarded as among the first Eastern Orthodox missionaries of the modern era, particularly in sub-Saharan Africa.
