= Transcaucasian Teachers Seminary =

Coordinates: 41°59′12″N 44°06′52″E

- გორის საოსტატო სემინარია
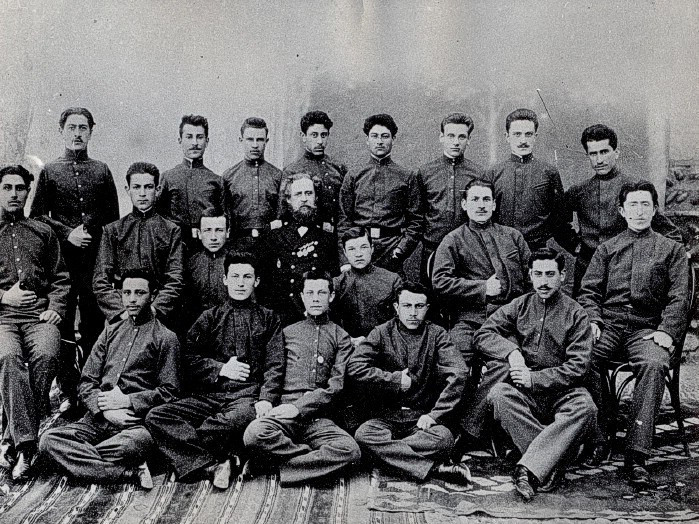
- "Students of the seminary, including Uzeyir Hajibeyov, Zulfugar Hajibeyov, Azad Amirov, Muslim Magomayev, Ali Teregulov, and Alirza Rasizade in 1904."
- Gori, Shida Kartli; Georgia

Information
- Language: Russian, Georgian, Azeri
- Campus: Urban

The Transcaucasian Teachers Seminary (Russian: Закавказская учительская семинария) in Gori (present-day Georgia) was a 4-year specialized secondary school in the Russian Empire in 1876–1917 aimed at professional training of primary school teachers. Historic building is currently used by Gori Public School N9.

== History ==
The Transcaucasian Teachers Seminary was founded as a specialized educational institution for the peoples of the Caucasus, who were interested in pursuing teaching careers at regional primary schools. The school was notable for having a Tatar department (Tatar was a common way of referring to Azeris and other Turkic-speaking ethnic groups of the Caucasus) established in 1879 as a result of Mirza Fatali Akhundov's efforts. The department was focusing on preparing instructors for primary schools attended only or mostly by Muslims. The language of instruction at the Transcaucasian Teachers Seminary was Russian.

After Sovietization, the seminary was reorganized into the Gori Pedagogical Institute.

== Famous alumni ==
- Uzeyir Hajibeyov
- Nariman Narimanov
- Vazha-Pshavela
- Jalil Mammadguluzadeh
- Muslim Magomayev, composer and opera conductor
- Mikhail Alexeyevich Miropiev
- Iakob Gogebashvili
- Suleyman Sani Akhundov
- Teymur Bayramalibeyov
- Nurmammad bey Shahsuvarov, Minister of Education and Religious Affairs of Azerbaijan Democratic Republic in the fifth cabinet of ADR
- Farhad Aghazade
- Mirza Huseyn Hasanzade
- Aliafsar Najafov
