= List of Eastern Orthodox missionaries =

14th century

- Stephen of Perm

16th century

- Patriarch Hermogenes of Moscow

18th century

- Cosmas of Aetolia

18th-19th century

- Herman of Alaska
- Iakinf (Bichurin) of Beijing

19th century

- Innocent of Alaska
- Jacob Netsvetov
- Macarius Nevsky
- Pallady (Kafarov) of Beijing

19th-20th century

- Mikhail Miropiev
- Raphael Morgan
- Nicholas of Japan
- Patriarch Tikhon of Moscow

20th century

- Anthony of Sourozh
- Anastasios (Yannoulatos) of Albania
- Benjamin Fedchenkov
- Chrysostomos Papasarantopoulos
- Jonah of Manchuria
- Patriarch Peter VII of Alexandria

21st century

- Daniil Sysoev
