= Mirza Huseyn Hasanzade =

Azerbaijani educator and politician

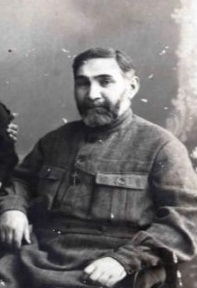
- Born: Mirzə Hüseyn Həsənzadə; 1869; Erivan, Erivan Governorate, Russian Empire
- Died: 1947/1948; Tbilisi, Tiflis Governorate, Russian Empire
- Occupation(s): Teacher, politician

Mirza Huseyn Hasanzade (Azerbaijani: Mirzə Hüseyn Həsənzadə; 1869–1947/1948), also known as Mirza Huseyn Iravani, was an Azerbaijani teacher and member of the Constituent Assembly of Georgia (formerly the National Council of Georgia).

== Biography ==
Mirza Huseyn was born in Erivan in 1869. He graduated from the Transcaucasian Teachers Seminary.

In the 1890s Mirza Huseyn became the principal-teacher in the Atsquri village school. He was the editor of Complete Alphabet textbook published in Tiflis in 1912 by Kultura (Culture) publishing house. Intended for the first grade, this book consisted of Arabic alphabet with vowel sounds. The textbook had 38 pages with several drawings, and included short stories and poems. During those years Mirza Huseyn also worked as a teacher in the second Kharpukh Azerbaijani primary school in Tiflis.

The life in Tiflis turned out to be an important part of his political career. Following the establishment of the Democratic Republic of Georgia, the National Council performed the parliamentary function. The Law, enacted 13 September 1918, allowed national minorities to be represented in the council. Azerbaijani citizens were allocated four deputy mandates to be elected from Georgian Azerbaijanis' National Council. On 29 September 1918, Aliheydar Garayev, Abdurrahim bey Hagverdiyev, Abdulaziz Sharifov and Mirza Huseyn Hasanzade were elected to the National Council of Georgia. A month later the Council declared itself the Constituent Assembly of Georgia.

Mirza Huseyn died in 1947, however there are several sources stating 1948 as his death date.

== See also ==
- Azerbaijanis in Georgia
