= Najafgulu Ismayilov =

Azerbaijani painter

Najafgulu Ismayilov Nəcəfqulu İsmayılov
- Born: March 15, 1923; Baku, Baku Uyezd, Azerbaijan SSR, TSFSR, USSR
- Died: March 25, 1990 (aged 67); Baku, Azerbaijan SSR, USSR
- Education: Azerbaijan State Art School
- Known for: painting
- Style: portrait, landscape painting, caricature, still life
- Spouse: Gullu Mustafayeva
- Awards: Honored Art Worker of the Azerbaijan SSR

Najafgulu Abdulrahim oghlu Ismayilov (Azerbaijani: Nəcəfqulu Əbdülrəhim oğlu İsmayılov, March 15, 1923–March 25, 1990) was an Azerbaijani painter, graphic artist, Honored Art Worker of the Azerbaijan.

== Biography ==
Najafgulu Ismayilov was born on March 15, 1923, in Baku. He studied at the Azerbaijan State Art School in 1936–1940, but was unable to continue his higher education due to the outbreak of the Great Patriotic War. From 1952 to 1979, he worked as a chief artist in the satirical magazine "Kirpi".

Najafgulu Ismayilov married the artist Gullu Mustafayeva in 1949. He is the father of organist Rana Ismayilova and violinist Sevinj Ismayilova. He died on March 25, 1990, in Baku.

== Career ==
Throughout his career, the artist worked as a graphic artist and painter. He created cartoons, caricatures and other graphic works for the satirical magazine "Kirpi", worked on paintings and posters, drew illustrations to the stories of Jalil Mammadguluzadeh, "Hophopname" by Mirza Alakbar Sabir.

The portrait genre has an important place in his work. His works of this kind include "Gubali Fatali khan" (1947), "General Hazi Aslanov" (1949), "Sara Ashurbeyli" (1951), "Poet Mirza Ali Mojuz" (1954), "Writer Abdulla Shaig" (1955)., "Mother" (1967), "Writer Jalil Mammadguluzadeh" (1967), "Poet Samad Vurgun" (1967), "Academician Mikayil Useynov" (1972), "Sattar Bahlulzade" (1973), "Uzeyir Hajibeyov" (1975), "Nasreddin Tusi" and other portraits.

His works in the genre of plot paintings and landscapes include "Grand Opera" (1960), "Street in the Old City" (1960), "Happiness" (1970), "Realist Artist" and others. He expressed his attitude to the negative situations he encountered in such cartoons as "Caring Farm Manager", "This is how a real board of honor is like", "We finally found a language", "Wordless" and others. In 1958, the artist created the historical work "Execution of Nasimi".

Najafgulu Ismayilov also wrote the words of his caricatures in the "Kirpi" magazine. He created portraits of a number of cultural figures, worked on friendly caricatures of Tahir Salahov, Mikayil Abdullayev, Fikret Amirov, Jalal Garyaghdi, Bashir Safaroglu and others.

Najafgulu Ismayilov has participated in art exhibitions organized in the republic and Moscow since the 1940s with historical plaques, copies, as well as images of cultural figures. He had opened solo exhibitions in Baku, Moscow and Leningrad, where several albums of his paintings and illustrations for books have been displayed. In 1970–1982, the artist also made copper bas-reliefs of Fuzuli, Mirza Alakbar Sabir, Uzeyir Hajibeyov. His works have been exhibited in exhibition halls in Germany, Canada, Lebanon, Russia and other countries. Many of the artist's paintings for "Kirpi" magazine were exhibited at an international laughter competition in the 1970s in Gabrovo, Bulgaria.

== Awards ==
- Honored Art Worker of the Azerbaijan SSR — April 12, 1963
- Medal "For Distinguished Labour" — June 9, 1959

== Literature ==
- Ҹ. Б. Гулијев, ed. (1983). Азәрбајҹан Совет Енсиклопедијасы: [10 ҹилддə]. Vol. VII ҹилд (Мисир – Прадо). Бакы: Азәрбајҹан Совет Енсиклопедијасынын Баш Редаксиjасы.
- "Nəcəfqulu". Cəlil Məmmədquluzadə Ensiklopediyası. Archived from the original on 13 March 2020.
- Кәримова, Р. (1964). Азәрбајҹан совет портрет бојакарлығы. Bakı: Азәрбајҹан ССР Елмләр Академијасы Нәшријјаты. p. 178.
