= Aliafsar Najafov =

Azerbaijani political figure (1896–1929)

- Əliəfsər Nəcəfov
- Aliafsar Najafov
- Born: Aliafsar Alimammad oghlu Najafov; 1896; Nukha, Elisabethpol Governorate, Russian Empire
- Died: 1929 (aged 32–33); Solovki prison camp, Solovetsky Islands, USSR
- Cause of death: Stalinist repressions (died during hunger strike)
- Other name: Alovsar Najafov
- Education: Transcaucasian Teachers Seminary
- Occupations: Politician, educator
- Spouse: Sayara Atamalibeyova
- Children: 2 (Chingiz, Asya)

Aliafsar (or Alovsar) Alimammad oghlu Najafov (1896–1929) was an Azerbaijani political figure, educator, and secretary of the chancellery office of the Council of Ministers of the Azerbaijan Democratic Republic (1918–1920), who fell victim to Stalinist repressions.

== Early life and education ==
Aliafsar Najafov was born in 1896 in the city of Nukha (now Shaki) into the family of a petty merchant. His lineage in Shaki was known by the patronymic moniker Yetim Najaflyar ("Orphan Najafs"). His maternal grandfather, Haji Mirbaba, was a well-known chavush-zavvar (pilgrim caravan guide) from Shaki.

After completing his secondary education, Najafov enrolled in the Transcaucasian Teachers Seminary in Gori in 1911 and graduated in 1917. He was fluent in Arabic, Persian, Turkish, and Russian. Following his graduation, he moved to Baku and began teaching physics and mathematics at the Baku Real School.

== Political activity ==
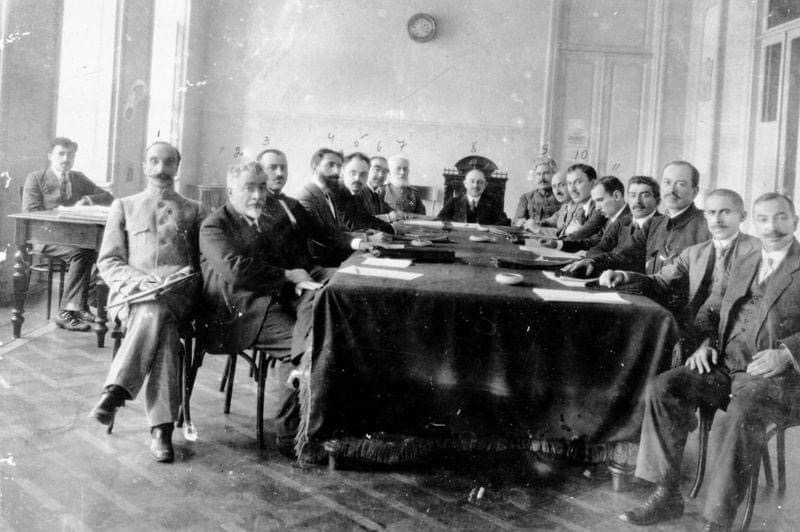
Najafov at a meeting of the ADR Council of Ministers (first from the left)

In 1918, Najafov became a member of the Turkic Decentralization Party (Musavat). Following the declaration of the Azerbaijan Democratic Republic on 28 May 1918, he became an active member of the Baku Committee of the Musavat Party.

Over the next two years, he served as secretary of the chancellery and clerical office within the government of the Azerbaijan Democratic Republic and attended meetings of the Council of Ministers. Following the Bolshevik takeover of Azerbaijan, Najafov continued his political activities underground as a member of the "Secret Musavat" (Gizli Müsavat). During this period, he also taught at the Oil Industry Technical School named after Nariman Narimanov.

== Arrest and death ==
In 1927, Najafov was arrested by the NKVD for anti-Soviet activity and was sentenced the same year to eight years of imprisonment as a Musavatist and "pan-Turkist". He was subsequently deported to the Solovki prison camp on the Solovetsky Islands.

At the camp, where approximately 300 Musavatists were detained, the prisoners went on hunger strike four times in protest against camp conditions. The final hunger strike lasted 56 days; Najafov died on the 53rd day of the strike in 1929. Like other prisoners who perished there, he was interred in an unmarked communal grave on Solovetsky Island.

By a decree of the Presidium of the Supreme Soviet of the Soviet Union on 16 January 1989, the victims known as the "Solovki heroes" were fully rehabilitated.

== Family ==
Aliafsar Najafov and his wife, Sayara Atamalibayova

In 1920, Najafov married Sayara Atamalibeyova, an educated noblewoman. Her father, Seyfulla bey Atamalibeyov, was an officer from Shamakhi who served as a colonel in the Imperial Russian Army. Sayara's brother, Abbas bey Atamalibeyov, was a diplomat and politician who served as a member of the Azerbaijani delegation to the 1919 Paris Peace Conference, meeting with U.S. President Woodrow Wilson. Through marriage, Najafov was also the brother-in-law of jurist and public figure Abbasali bey Makinski.

Najafov and his wife had two children, Asya and Chingiz:

- Asya Najafova worked as a psychiatrist and married Azerbaijani painter and Honored Art Worker of the Azerbaijan SSR Sadig Sharifzadeh.
- Chingiz Najafov worked as a physician and died in 1971. His son, Fariz Najafov, married Azerbaijani organist and Honored Artist Rana Ismayilova.
