= Suleyman Sani Akhundov =

Azerbaijani playwright, journalist and author

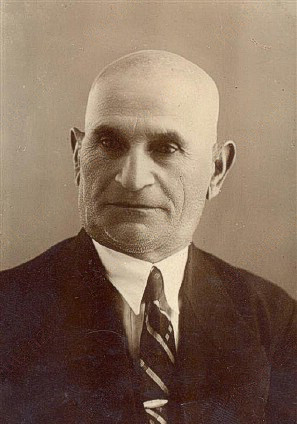
- Born: October 3, 1875; Shusha, Russian Empire
- Died: March 29, 1939 (aged 63); Baku, Azerbaijan
- Education: Transcaucasian Teachers Seminary

Suleyman Sani Rzagulu bey oghlu Akhundov (Azerbaijani: Süleyman Sani Rzaqulu bəy oğlu Axundov; 3 October 1875 – 29 March 1939), was an Azerbaijani playwright, journalist, author, and teacher. He chose the name Sani (Arabic for "the second") to distinguish himself from his namesake, Mirza Fatali Akhundov.

== Life and contributions ==
Akhundov was born to a noble family in Shusha (then part of the Russian Empire) and graduated from the Transcaucasian Teachers Seminary (present-day Gori, Georgia) in 1894. He was involved in teaching and journalism for the rest of his life. He was the co-author of the Azeri language textbook İkinci il ("The Second Year"), which was published in 1906. After Sovietization he served as Minister of Education of Azerbaijani SSR's Nagorno-Karabakh Autonomous Oblast for a short period of time. In 1922, Suleyman Sani Akhundov was chosen the first chairman of the Union of Writers and Poets of Azerbaijan. In 1932, he was awarded an honorary title of the Hero of Labour for his merits in literary and pedagogical activity. Between 1920 and 1930, he was chosen as a member of the Baku Soviet, probationary member of the executive committee of Baku, and mesehver of the Central Executive Committee of the Azerbaijan SSR.

== Creativity stories ==
Akhundov's first fictional piece, Tamahkar ("The Greedy One"), was written in 1899. Between 1912 and 1913 he wrote a pentalogy entitled Qorxulu nağıllar ("Scary Stories"), which dealt with the theme of poverty and social inequality and therefore became one of the most popular children books later in the Soviet epoch. Works written by the writer after the 1905 Russian Revolution were concerned with social-political problems, highlighting them from the democratic position. In his works written after 1920 he continued with his criticism of patriarchal norms, social backwardness, and despotism of the ruling class, and describes the expectations of people from the newly established political system. Such works as "Fortune's wheel" (1921), "Falcon's nest" (1921), "Love and revenge" (1922) drama were written by Suleyman Sani Akhundov.

== Legacy ==
There's a street named after Suleyman Sani Akhundov in Baku.
