= Chrysostomos Papasarantopoulos =

Greek Eastern Orthodox missionary

Saint Chrysostomos Papasarantopoulos
- Born: Christos Papasarantopoulos; 1903; Vasilitsi, Messenia, Greece
- Died: 29 December 1972
- Honored in: Eastern Orthodox Church
- Canonized: 8 October 2025 by the Greek Orthodox Patriarchate of Alexandria

Rev. Archimandrite Chrysóstomos Papasarantópoulos (Greek: Χρυσόστομος Παπασαραντόπουλος, 1903–1972) was a pioneering missionary of the Eastern Orthodox Christianity in Uganda, Kenya, Tanzania, and Congo.

== Greece 1903–1960 ==
=== Childhood Years ===
Rev. Archimandrite Chrysostomos Papasarantopoulos was born Christos Papasarantopoulos in 1903 in Vasilitsi, Messenia, Greece, to Theodoros Papasarantopoulos and Stavroula Trigourea (afterwards Nun Sebastiani), the seventh child of the family. He was born into a devout Christian home, and from childhood he devoted his life to Christ. At the age of 10 he lost his father, and was forced to leave school in order to work.

At 15 years of age he left his family home in secret and went to settle at the Koroni monastery in order to pursue his longing for the spiritual life; however he soon left this monastery since his relatives would visit him and beg him to return to the family.

Afterwards, he went to Kalamata, to the then well-known Hermitage of Panagoulakis (Holy Monastery of the Annunciation of the Virgin Mary), (Note: Hermitage of Panagoulakis in Kalamata, Greece (Greek: Ιερά Μονή Ευαγγελισμού της Θεοτόκου Παναγουλάκη). This monastery is currently Old Calendarist and not in communion with the Church of Greece.) known for its strict asceticism; here he became a monk. The excesses of the Igumen there and the very strict lifestyle of that Hermitage overcame him and left him with a permanent health problem.

=== Later years ===
During the years 1920–1929 Archimandrite Chrysostomos stayed at the Gardikiou Monastery, in Messenia. On May 4, 1926, he was ordained into the priesthood, and was appointed as the Igumen of that monastery.

At some point he tonsured his mother as a Nun. For several years he served the surrounding villages as the officiating priest. During this period Fr. Chrysostomos found time to complete his school studies (via Homeschooling), and undertook to learn the French language. After the disestablishment of the Monastery of Gardikiou (due to lack of personnel), Fr. Chrysostomos transferred to the Metochion of the Holy Monastery of Voulkano, Chrysokellaria, near Koroni. (Note: (Greek: Παλαιά Ιερά Μονή Βουλκάνου). This Byzantine monastery dates from the year 725 A.D. according to tradition.)

He then came to Athens and joined the Petraki Monastery, where his main duty was that of father confessor for people of all ages and walks of life, becoming well respected and loved. In the years of occupation (Note: Second World War, and the ensuing Greek Civil War.) Fr. Chrysostomos went to Edessa where he served as the General Hierarchical Vicar and Protosyngellos. Subsequently, he was transferred to Kozani, Thessaloniki, and Athens, where he received his Secondary School Diploma. Eventually he returned again to the Petraki Monastery, from where he determined to enroll in the University of Athens Theological School. At the age of 55, in 1958, he finally received his theological degree.

During the course of his studies in Athens he came into contact with certain colleagues of African descent, who may have inspired him towards his forthcoming mission. The African students at the university were from Uganda, and represented the first native Orthodox Christians from Uganda to be formally educated in the Orthodox faith. One of these fellow students, Theodore Nankyamas, would later play a prominent role and become one of the first Orthodox bishops in East Africa. Another, Demetrios Mumbale, would become the first Orthodox physician and founder of an Orthodox medical clinic in Uganda. In the event, after many years of faithful service in his native country, he experienced a strong leading, a true "Macedonian Call," (Note: Acts 16:6-10.) to go as a missionary to Africa.

== Africa 1960–1972 ==
=== Uganda ===
At the age of 57 Fr. Chrysostomos decided to go on his mission to Africa. The Archbishop at that time, as well as his acquaintances, tried to discourage him on the pretext of his advanced age and state of health. However, during a trip to the Holy Land, he met the Patriarch of Alexandria Christophoros II from whom he obtained the blessing, (Note: Formal ecclesiastical permission to undertake an action is referred to as a "blessing". The blessing may be bestowed by a bishop or priest, or by one's own spiritual father.) thus resolving to continue the mission.

In 1960 Archimandrite Chrysostomos Papasarantopoulos went to Kampala, Uganda, where he worked for ten years before moving to Zaire to begin a new mission there. Through correspondence he also encouraged others to become involved in mission, among them the present Bishop Makarios of Riruta, Kenya. (Note: Archbishop Makarios (Tillyrides) of Kenya has been: Bishop of Riruta (1992-1998), Archbishop of Zimbabwe (1998-2001), and Archbishop of Kenya (2001-present).) After years of repression by the British colonial regime (Note: The British Protectorate of Uganda was a protectorate of the British Empire from 1894 to 1962. With the onset of the Mau-Mau Movement (1952-60) in Kenya (British East Africa Protectorate), the Eastern Orthodox Church was banished by the British Colonial Government, suffering severe oppression.) and the disingenuous propaganda of the Catholic and Protestant missionaries who supported it, the Eastern Orthodox Church was in a perilous state.

Father Chrysostomos wrote about the first difficulties he encountered:

...(there are) neither homes, nor churches, nor clergy.[...] the few Greek families here live miles away from each other. Likewise the Black Orthodox are also scattered in tens and hundreds of miles in the four cardinal directions...

He began an extensive correspondence program, writing to friends, relatives and acquaintances who might be able to help in any way. Thus he slowly started to receive aid from Greece, Europe and America in the form of packages of clothing, cheques, utensils and other items. In another letter he wrote:

...by the end of March 1961 the inauguration and opening of the small church of our mission was completed...I have not yet learned the (Bantu) language of Luganda, however I have learned Swahili to a considerable extent. I speak it together mixed with English, and I am understood fairly well.

Learning a new language at that age was not easy, but within a year of arriving in Africa, Father Chrysostomos could preach in Swahili. He provided catechesis, he taught, and performed the Divine Liturgy, and baptized numerous of the Indigenous peoples. In addition, he prepared others for the mission, guiding them towards the priesthood.

In 1963 Father Chrysostomos became the spiritual founder of the missionary society "The Friends of Uganda." This Society continues its mission today based in the city of Thessaloniki. (Note: This Society has as its goal the moral and material support of Orthodox External Mission all over the world. It started off its activities under the name of “The Friends of Uganda” (First Period: 1963-1971); later it continued its course under the name the “Greek Fellowship of Orthodox External Mission” (Second Period: 1972-1978); and since 1979 (Third Period), it has been functioning under the name “Brotherhood of Orthodox External Mission of Thessalonica” (Greek: ΑΔΕΛΦΟΤΗΤΑ ΟΡΘΟΔΟΞΟΥ ΕΞΩΤΕΡΙΚΗΣ ΙΕΡΑΠΟΣΤΟΛΗΣ ΘΕΣΣΑΛΟΝΙΚΗ). At present it publishes the quarterly magazine “External Mission.”)

=== Kenya, Tanzania, Congo ===
He then expanded the mission to neighbouring Kenya (Note: Kenya's post-colonial history started when it became independent on 12 December 1963.) and Tanzania (Tanganyika). In Nairobi he created another missionary station, stating "the work (of mission) is progressing, Orthodoxy is expanding." He also completed a translation of the Divine Liturgy and various Prayers into Swahili.

Although he made constant appeals for assistance in his correspondence to Greece, inviting others to join the mission, he received no response. At an advanced age, he preached often.

For 10 years, Father Chrysostomos laboured in Uganda, Kenya and Tanzania, but also desired to preach in the country which is today called the Democratic Republic of Congo. (Note: Called Zaire from 1971-1997.)

In 1970 Father Chrysostomos went to live in Congo to begin a new mission there, staying there for two years, that is, for the remainder of his life. Here he met with an even greater response from the Indigenous population, however he was beset by an enormous lack of material assistance and helpers to assist him. In Congo, Chrysostomos was joined by his niece, Olga Papasarandou, whom he called from Greece to help him. She agreed to join him and moved to Congo, where she engaged in the mission's effort, succeeding her uncle as the sole Eastern Orthodox missionary in the area for a time, after the death of Chrysostomos.

One month before his death, he wrote a letter saying:

I love the Africans and am fully convinced that the Lord has brought me here. I hope to use the few remaining days of my old age preaching and teaching here. The place I am now located in is a large city (Kananga) of 50,000 people near the central part of the Congo. The people are eager to learn about Orthodox Christianity. But I am old and alone and my capacities are now limited. I don't know how I'll manage, but the Lord Jesus will show me, as He always has in the past. Remember me in your prayers.

=== Death ===
On December 13, 1972, while travelling from Kananga to Lubumbashi he was overcome by profuse nose-bleeding. He returned to Kananga, celebrated the Divine Liturgy on Christmas Day, and died on December 29, 1972. (Note: A very close co-worker with Father Chrysostomos Papasarantopoulos in East Africa had been a Greek Archimandrite named Athanasios Anthidis, who offered his mission work there for many years. On Christmas 1980, Father Athanasios traveled to India to begin a systematic Orthodox Mission in the rural area of Arambah, in West Bengal. He died in 1990, and was succeeded a year later by priest-monk Fr. Ignatios Sennis, who came to Calcutta to continue the mission.)

By July 1973 he was succeeded in the missionary echelon of Kananga by his old friend and partner, the Archimandrite Chariton (Pneumatikakis) (1908–1998). (Note: On Sunday 21 October 2012 the Pope and Patriarch of Alexandria and All Africa, Theodoros II, consecrated the Church of Saint Andrew in Kananga, Congo, being the largest Orthodox Church in Africa to date. During his homily, His Beatitude spoke about the vision of the late missionary Fr. Charitonas Pneumatikakis, about the construction of a large Orthodox Church in the region of Kananga, a project which began in 2004 and was completed in 2010 by the then Metropolitan of Central Africa and the current Metropolitan of Pentapoleos, Ignatios.)

On December 29, 1985, the Metropolis of Messenia erected a bust of Father Chrysostom in his honor. And on December 29, 1987, the Academy of Athens awarded him posthumously the silver medal of honor.

== Legacy ==
Father Chrysostomos opened the road for modern Orthodox missionary activity in Africa. He started out at 57 years of age all by himself without any aid, and found himself in Africa preaching the Gospel. Numerous obstacles confronted him: racism, language barriers, primitive living conditions, lack of funds, limitations imposed upon him by superiors, ill health, poor diet, etc. Not one to despair easily, Fr. Chrysostomos would say that he managed "with God's help".

After labouring for twelve years across Uganda, Kenya, Tanzania and Congo, and having learned the Swahili and French languages at a relatively old age, he died in Africa having started a huge task, which was continued with great success.

Today there is a Metropolitan of the Eastern Orthodox Church in Kinshasa. Father Chrysostomos was the pioneer, who laid the foundations, on which the superstructure of Orthodoxy in Congo was raised up. Kenya is not a small country, but Congo is more than four times the size of Kenya. Father Chrysostomos was always on the move, traveling widely. His life was a continuous round of traveling, preaching, baptizing, planting churches and celebrating the Divine Liturgy.

As with all preachers of the Gospel, the full results of Fr. Papasarantopoulos' missionary efforts in Africa will be known only to the Lord of the Church. Orthodox history teaches that like prayer, the life of "a righteous man has great power in its effect" (James 5:16). However the seemingly humble ministry of this one missionary, advanced in age before he began, has had a direct effect on the Eastern Orthodox Church in both Greece and the United States. Shortly after his departure for Africa from Athens, a new missionary movement began in Greece in 1961 called "The Inter-Orthodox Missionary Center" under the aegis of the Pan-Orthodox Youth movement Syndesmos. ...A new journal entitled Porefthentes (Go Ye), edited by Anastasios G. Yannoulatos accompanied this movement. Through the writings and influence of Yannoulatos, now a bishop and professor at the University of Athens, and this new movement, interest in missions has greatly expanded in Greece over the past twenty years. Today there are at least three missionary societies in that country operating out of Athens, Thessalonike, and Patras, all of which publish journals on missions. There were no such official organizations existing in modern Greece prior to Fr. Papasarantopoulos' venture of faith in Africa. It is noteworthy that all developed almost immediately after Fr. Papasarantopoulos' correspondence from the mission field began to ignite the faith of his friends and supporters in Greece. A similar phenomenon occurred in the United States.

=== Canonization ===
On October 8, 2025, the Holy Synod of the Patriarchate of Alexandria canonized Chrysostomos, and a service to the saint was published in Greek.

On March 22, 2026 the relics of the newly canonized St. Chrysostomos the Missionary were solemnly uncovered, in a significant ceremony led by Patriarch Theodoros II, alongside hierarchs and clergy of the Patriarchate of Alexandria, in the city of Kananga in the Democratic Republic of the Congo.

== See also ==
- Eastern Orthodox Patriarchate of Alexandria
- Eastern Orthodoxy in Uganda
- Christianity in Africa
- Orthodox Christian Mission Center
- List of Eastern Orthodox missionaries
- African Orthodox Church (non-canonical)

== Sources and further reading ==
- Fr. Alexander Veronis (OCMC). Orthodox Concepts of Evangelism and Mission. In: Paul Wesley Chilcote, & Laceye C. Warner (Eds.). The Study of Evangelism: Exploring a Missional Practice of the Church. Wm. B. Eerdmans Publishing, 2008. pp. 279–294. ISBN 978-0-8028-0391-7
- George P. Liacopulos. Church and Society: Orthodox Christian Perspectives, Past Experiences, and Modern Challenges. Somerset Hall Press, 2007. ISBN 978-0-9774610-5-9
- Gerald H. Anderson. Papasarantopoulos, Chrysostom (1903–1972). In: Biographical Dictionary of Christian Missions. Wm. B. Eerdmans Publishing, 1999. p. 514. ISBN 978-0-8028-4680-8
- Makarios (Tillyrides) of Kenya. Sermon at a Memorial Service for the Pioneer Missionary Rev. Archimandrite Chrysostomos Papasarantopoulos, at the Church of St. Paul, Kagira, 29 December 1993. Adventures in the Unseen, Volume 1. Orthodox Research Institute, 2004. pp. 115–119. ISBN 978-0-9745618-5-1
- Holy Metropolis of Messenia. Holy Monastery of Gardikiou.
- Stephen Hayes. Orthodox Mission in Tropical Africa. Missionalia (Journal of the Southern African Missiological Society).

Greek sources

- Χρυσόστομος Παπασαραντόπουλος. Greek Wikipedia.
- Aναμνηστικός τόμος Ελληνικής Εταιρείας Ορθοδόξου Εξωτερικής Ιεραποστολής. Αρχιμανδρίτης Χρυσόστομος Παπασαραντόπουλος. Θεσσαλονίκη 1974. Επιμέλεια: Π.Δ.Παπαδημητρακόπουλου.
- Περιοδικό "Φως Εθνών". Ορθοδόξου Ιεραποστολής "Ο Πρωτόκλητος", τεύχος 114.
- Aρχιμ. Χαρίτων Πνευματικάκις. Στην Αφρική για το Χριστό ο Αρχιμανδρίτης Χρυσόστομος Παπασαρντόπουλος.
- Papasarantopoulos, Chrysostom. A report on the missionary work carried out in the Metropolis of Eirinoupolis (East Africa). Porefthendes. Athens, 5, 1963, 2–3.
