= Mikhail Miropiev =

Russian missionary (1852–1919)

Mikhail Alexeyevich Miropiev (Russian: Михаил Алексеевич Миропиев; 1852 – 8 December 1919) was a Russian Orthodox missionary who worked in the Caucasus in the late 19th and early 20th centuries.

At the turn of the 20th century, he was the director of the Caucasus Teacher's Seminary. He later served as inspector of the Orenburg Educational Region.

He wrote several works concerning Islam and the conversion of Muslims in Russia to the Russian Orthodox faith.
