= Gullu Mustafayeva =

Soviet Azerbaijani painter (1919–1994)

Gullu Mustafayeva Güllü Mustafayeva
- Born: Gullu Haji Naim Mustafa gizi Mustafayeva; October 29, 1919; Charjuy, Turkestan ASSR, RSFSR, USSR
- Died: May 18, 1994 (aged 74); Baku, Azerbaijan
- Known for: painting
- Style: portrait, landscape painting, still life
- Spouse(s): Hasan Hagverdiyev; Najafgulu Ismayilov
- Awards: Honored Artist of the Azerbaijan SSR

Gullu Haji Naim Mustafa gizi Mustafayeva (Azerbaijani: Güllü Hacı Naim Mustafa qızı Mustafayeva, November 29, 1919–May 18, 1994) was a Soviet Azerbaijani artist and portrait painter. She was awarded the title of People's Artist of Azerbaijan.

== Biography ==
Gullu Mustafayeva was born on November 29, 1919, in Charjuy (now Türkmenabat), Turkestan ASSR (now Turkmenistan). She was originally from Shamakhi. In 1927, she moved with her family from Turkmenia to Baku, Old City.

Mustafayeva graduated from Azerbaijan State Art College in 1938. Mustafayeva created portraits of labor heroes, figures of science and art of her time. Some of these are the portraits of the two-time Hero of Socialist Labor Basti Bagirova, ophthalmologist, doctor of medical sciences Umnisa Musabayova, neurologist, doctor of medical sciences Zahra Salayeva, people's artist Sattar Bahlulzade.

In Mustafayeva's works, children's portraits form a special series, the "our children" series. The portrait "Mahsati Ganjavi" created in 1947 has a special place in the artist's work. Her works are kept in National Art Museum of Azerbaijan and Azerbaijan State Art Gallery.

Mustafayeva died on May 18, 1994, in Baku, Azerbaijan.

== See also ==
- List of Azerbaijani artists
- List of Azerbaijani women artists
