= Pax Ottomana =

Historiographical term

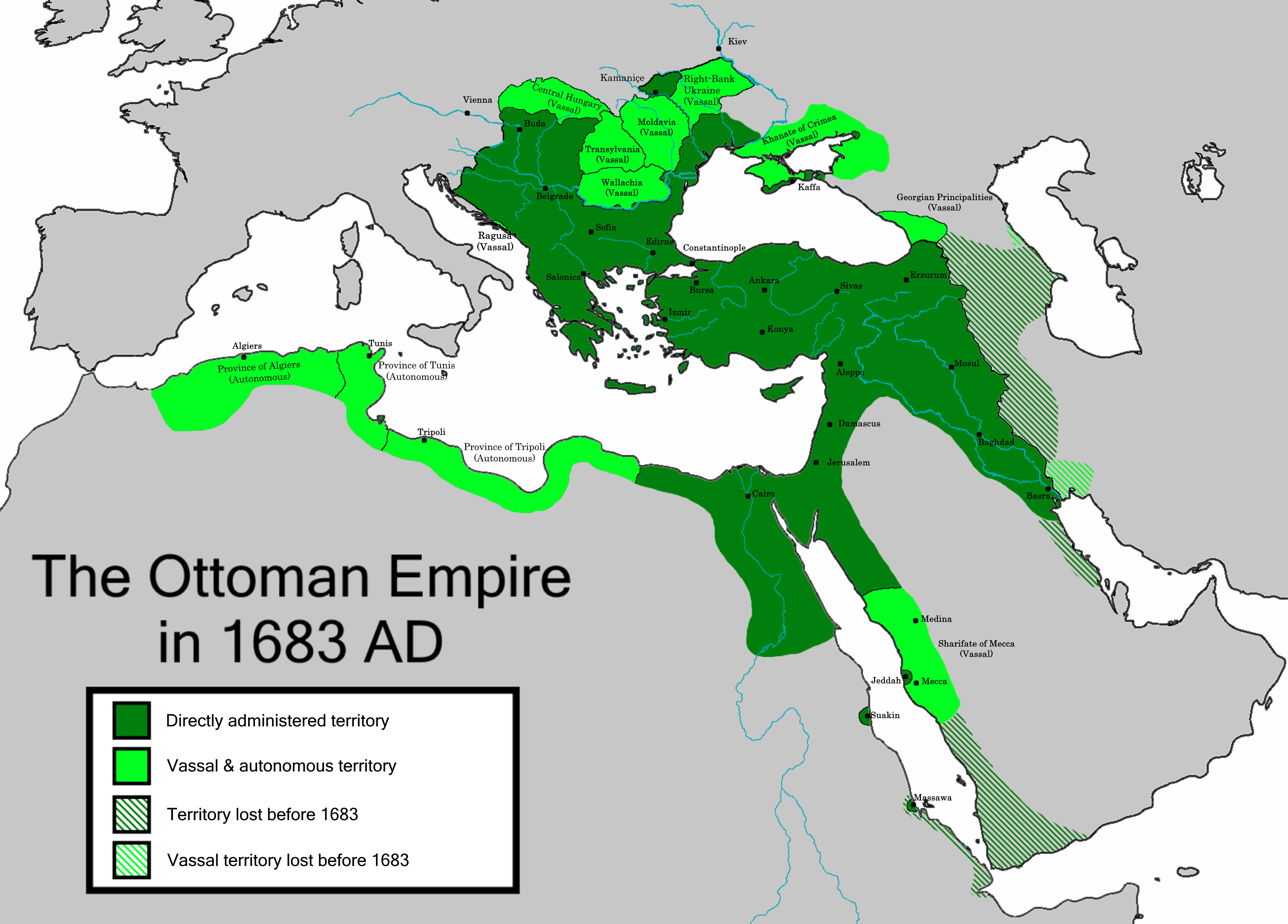
The Ottoman Empire at its greatest extent, under Sultan Mehmed IV

In historiography, the Pax Ottomana (literally "the Ottoman Peace") or Pax Ottomanica is a term used to describe the economic and social stability attained in the conquered provinces of the Ottoman Empire at the height of its power during the 16th and 17th centuries, applied to lands in the Balkans, Anatolia, the Middle East, North Africa, the Caucasus, and western Iran.

The term is preferred in particular by historians and writers who hold a positive view of Ottoman rule to underline the positive impact of Ottoman rule on the conquered regions. They compare it favourably with the instability experienced before the Ottoman founding and conquests, as well as with the period after World War I, when only Asia Minor and Eastern Thrace remained under Turkish rule and the Ottoman Empire was officially dissolved.

The term is derived by analogy from the more common Pax Romana, "the Roman Peace,” and is sometimes used by those who consider the Ottoman Empire to be a continuation of the Byzantine Empire.
