= Ilias Miniatis =

Greek clergyman, writer and preacher

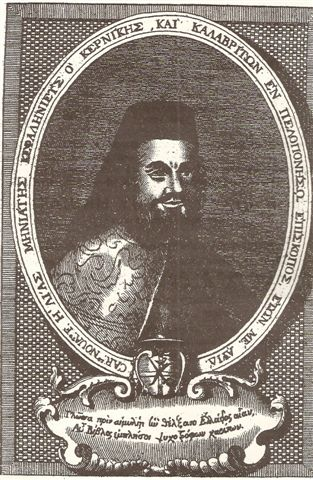

Ilias Miniatis (Greek: Ηλίας Μηνιάτης) (1669 at Lixouri – 1714 at Patras) was a Greek clergyman, writer and preacher. At the Flanginian School he learned Ancient Greek and Latin and became interested in mathematics and philology. He was ordained very early. He preached God's word at his home island, Cephalonia, at Zakynthos, at Corfu and at Constantinople. His preachings are considered exemplars for modern ecclesiastical rhetoric. As of his language, it is simple Modern Greek and his style has something dramatical and hymnographic. His eloquent preachings are collected into the book "Διδαχαί" (Teachings), first published at Venice on 1725. An older book is "Η Πέτρα του Σκανδάλου" (The Start of the Scandal) about the Photian schism. Many historians consider him a student of Frangiscos Scoufos and others an imitator of Paolo Segneri. With his speeches he helped the development of ecclesiastical rhetoric and the configuration of Modern Greek language.
