= Farhad Aghazade =

Farhad Rahim oglu Aghazade
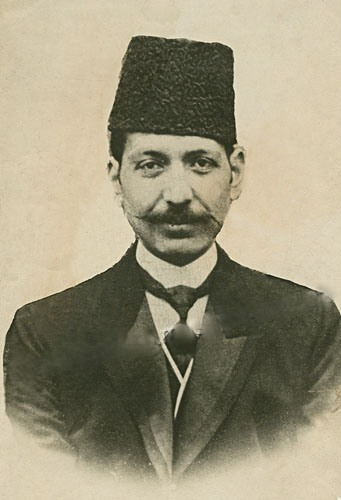
- Farhad Aghazade. 1900–1910
- Born: 12 August 1880; Shusha, Russian Empire
- Died: 4 January 1931 (aged 50); Baku, Azerbaijan SSR
- Scientific career
- Fields: Linguist and journalist

Farhad Aghazade (Azerbaijani: Fərhad Rəhim oğlu Ağazadə) (12 August 1880, in Shusha, Russian Empire – 4 January 1931 in Baku, Azerbaijan SSR, USSR) was an Azerbaijani teacher, linguist, journalist.

== Life ==
Farhad Agazade graduated from the Transcaucasian Teachers Seminary (1900), was engaged in teaching activities in Baku, Shusha, Ganja and Khachmas. For a long time he maintained friendly and creative relations with Uzeyir Hajibeyov. He participated in cultural and educational events of the Baku Muslim Educational Society "Nijat", actively collaborated with Uzeyir Hajibeyov in the newspapers "Hayat", "Irshad", as well as in the preparation of school programs and textbooks. Uzeyir Hajibeyov published in the newspaper "Taraggi" a review of Agazade's textbook "Second Year" (1907), compiled by him together with several teachers. In 1909–1918, Agazadeh, who taught at the "Saadat" school, repeatedly reminded Uzeyir Hajibeyov, who worked with him, of Hasan bey Zardabi's order to create a large-scale musical work. In 1918–1920 he collaborated with Uzeyir Hajibeyov in the newspaper "Azerbaijan". In the memoirs of Agazade's wife Govkhar khanum ("Azerbaijan Gadyns", 1969, No. 2), the family nature of their friendship is emphasized.

== Selected works ==
- Oчерк по истории развития движения нового алфавита и его достижения
- История возникновения и проникновения в жизнь идеи нового тюркского алфавита в АССР. С 1922 по 1925 год
- Первый Всесоюзный Тюркологический съезд 26 февраля — 5 марта 1926
- Материалы по унификации проектов нового тюркского алфавита

== Sources ==
- Anvar, Chingizoglu (2013). Просвещение в Карабахе. Baku: Zardabi LTD. ISBN 978-9952-460-29-2.
- Aghayev, A.A. (1989). Hashimov, A.SH. (ed.). Антология педагогической мысли Азербайджанской ССР. Moskow: Педагогика. pp. 590–592.
- Aghayev, A.A. (1987). Педагогические взгляды Фархада Агазаде. Baku: Zardabi LTD. ISBN 978-9952-460-29-2.
