= Social class in the Ottoman Empire =

Social structure of the Ottoman Empire

The Ottoman Empire was one of the most dominant empires in the Mediterranean region, having lasted ~600 years and controlling much of the eastern and southern portions of the Sea. Albert Hourani described the Ottoman Empire as "a bureaucratic state, holding different regions within a single administrative and fiscal system".

The Ottoman Empire lasted for over six hundred years (1299–1923) and encompassed present-day Turkey, the Balkans and the Fertile Crescent. Thus the Empire included an extremely diverse population ranging from the Muslim majority (Turks, Arabs, Bosniaks, Albanians, etc.) to various minority populations, specifically Christians and Jews, whom Muslims referred to as "People of the Book". As an imperial colonial enterprise, the Ottoman system allowed some Greeks, Tatars, Italians, Albanians, Serbs, Hungarians, Georgians, Bulgarians, Ruthenians and Circassians, kul and azad, to attain high office as soldiers, viziers or members of the imperial family.

== Socioeconomic divisions ==
The Ottoman system traditionally stood on a division between four socioeconomic groups: the military, the learned, the merchants, and the peasants. Each group had its own set of skills and societal roles that came with different privileges and social statuses: while the military and the intellectual classes were rather influential in politics, the peasantry was much more disenfranchised from the central power. By the 19th century, this system had disintegrated with the progressive emergence of the ayans,^{[3]} a group of urban notables.

This was a class of local notables, who often had a role in governing to some degree, especially from the seventeenth century onward. Also played the role of warlords at times, appearing most often in Anatolia, Syria, and Egypt. In the mid-18th century, in Rumelia and Anatolia, this became a title for district nobles who were elected by their community to negotiate in its name and handle taxes and security.

The 19th century also saw the rise of a new political and socioeconomic class: the modern bureaucracy. In 1826, Mahmud II shut down the Janissaries, abolished the tulumbacı, and merged the Bektaşi and Nakşibendi religious orders together. From the Sultan’s point of view, that meant the loss of many supporting foundations: quickly, a new bureaucracy emerged as a symbol of Ottoman modernity, the effendis, whom could not be criticized and eventually came to assume government control.

=== Askeri ===
They were a social class made up primarily of the military and all public servants and members of their households. This class depended on the Sultan for income and as such, were not included in taxation. They were not considered to be aristocrats however, as membership depended on the Sultan's desires. The askeri held their class unless specifically dismissed by the Sultan or if they pursued a non-governmental role. Additionally, according to some sources, only non-Muslims were allowed to join this class, as a means to ensure loyalty only to the Sultan.

The soldiers and their commander belonged to a subclass called the "kul" and were considered slaves of the Sultan.

On the other hand, there was a political subclass called the "askeri kassam". Whose estates were often liable to confiscation by the Sultan.

Some sources instead divide the askeri into multiple branches: the kalemiye, the seyfiye, and the ilmiye.

The kalemiye were the scribal branch, the ilmiye focused on religious and judicial services, and the seyfiye were the military and administrative branch.

Some of the most notable roles to fall under the askeri class were people who performed: praying, preaching, scribal service, superintendency, tax and rent collection, trusteeship, couriers, falconers, guardians of bridges and passes, tent-makers, dealers of oil and butter, tent-pitchers, copper miners, rice-growers, judges, circuit judges, and city wardens, along with the sons and wives of askeri members and freed slaves.

=== Rayah ===
Alternatively spelled as "reaya". Considered to be the class that was ruled over. Made up of merchants, artisans, and peasants and were the taxed class. This group was largely Muslim, though their Christian counterparts were also placed under the same label. Ottoman officials sought to disarm this class and prevent them from achieving any sort of military status in the sixteenth and seventeenth centuries. They were typically considered the lesser class and dubbed as non-governing.

The rayah class was largely divided by religion, with each religious group being divided into an internally autonomous community called a millet. These groups were allowed to maintain their own traditional laws and could have internal administrative organizations led by their own religious leader.

The Muslim millet was considered to be above the other millets due to their practicing of the same laws and religion as the ruling class of the empire.

== Ethno-religious divisions ==
=== Muslims ===
Muslims were granted a higher social status than other religious groups in the Ottoman Empire: they were considered “first-class subjects,” in opposition to non-Muslims who were considered “second-class subjects.” Several privileges came with the status of Muslim: many high-ranking positions were reserved for Muslims, Muslims were frequently privileged by the law, one could not be enslaved by a non-Muslim, etc. The Muslim category was a flexible one: many members of other religious groups converted to Islam in order to access certain benefits.

Even among Muslims, different groups enjoyed different levels of privilege: Turks, as the “conquering” population, enjoyed some degree of superiority over other Muslim groups, including Arabs, Kurds, Albanians, and Bosniaks who were all conquered against their will. Nevertheless, conquered groups retained a great deal of agency: for instance, Muslim Bosniaks and Albanians were involved in the governance of the empire and were a part of the Janissary units.

=== Non-Muslims under the Millet system ===
Non-Muslims occupied a subordinate position within the Ottoman Empire. Christians, in particular, were derided as Giaours ("infidels"). The subordinate status of non-Muslims was codified by the Millets, a system of semi-autonomous religious communities, that persisted between the fall of Constantinople to the nineteenth century, . There were three basic Millets: the Greek, the Jewish, and the Armenian communities: though many other ethnic and religious existed, most were incorporated into and ruled by one of the three major Millets. Despite ostensibly being protected for being "people of the book", persecution of Christians within the Ottoman Empire has a long history.

Non-Muslims, notable Christians, were forced to pay disproportionately higher taxes than Muslims within the empire, including the humiliating poll-tax, which according to certain sources was a material proof of the dhimmis' subjection. Even pregnant mothers had to pay jizya on behalf of their unborn children.

There were notably three domains in which autonomy was important to non-Muslims. The first one was that of religious theory and practice: though Muslims did not directly interfere in theological matters, they still imposed religious restrictions. For example, non-Muslims religious buildings could not tower over Mosques, the availability of specific commodities such as wine, kosher meat, or communion wafer was determined at the discretion of Muslim authorities. Non-Muslims were formally prohibited from dressing like Muslims and were required to wear distinctive clothing, a policy justified on the grounds that their proper condition under Islamic law was one of "humility and abjection". Violations of such clothing restrictions could be punishable by death.

The second important domain of autonomy under the Millet system was that of administration and taxation: lay leaders, generally elected by their community, were in charge of administrative matters such as making arrangements with regards to the collection of taxes. The third domain concerned non-Muslims’ legal jurisdictions. Jews and Christians were notably allowed to adjudicate legal disputes between members of their group: in Jewish communities, rabbinical courts could rule on criminal cases.

The Millets developed internal class structures: the upper layers of this strata were composed of merchant elites residing in Istanbul as well as of the high clergy, while the lower classes were made of new type merchants and craftsmen. Ethnic and religious differences within the Millet did not matter to the central Ottoman authorities: within the Greek Millet, Romanians, Albanians, Serbs, etc. could shift from one identity to another without changing their status vis-à-vis the metropole. To the Millet authorities however, such ethnic and religious differences were important and even instrumental in highlighting divisions.

Divisions between Millets were reflected in the organization of cities such as Istanbul: until the beginning of the nineteench century, religious groups inhabitied their traditional quarters. In Istanbul, Greeks lived in Fener, Samatya, Cibal, and in villages along the Bosporus; Armenians inhabited Kumkapi and Samatya; Jews lived in Balat, Hasköy, and Kasımpaşa.

The Millet as a system of social divisions along ethno-religious lines lost its vigor throughout the eighteenth and nineteenth centuries with the rise of liberation and nationalist movements, especially in the Greek Millet. Starting in the second half of the eighteenth century, Western enlightened ideals and the French Revolution started to inspired a growing intelligentsia among the Greek Millet until the Greek War of Independence. While some historians argue such a revolt was of a nationalist nature, others have claimed that it was a religious movement eager to liberate itself from Muslim oppression rather than a rebellion driven by the will to form a nation. Following the rebellion, religious divisions were transformed as Greeks lost many of their privileges and came to be seen as a group to fear rather than as a community to respect and accommodate. The Orthodox patriarchate, though he did not participate in the uprising, was hanged; the post of dragoman (interpreter), who since the mid-seventeenth century had been reserved to Greeks, was given to a Turk.

=== The Conveniencia model ===
According to historian Baki Tezcan, the millet system did not stay static over time. Drawing from Brian Catlos’s analysis of intercommunal relationships in the medieval Mediterranean as “the consequence of a series of relationships born of a perceived mutual benefit among majority and minority ethno-religious groups, reinforced by formal agreements set in law, and grounded in a mutually-conceded, if limited, legitimacy,” Tezcan explains that religious divisions functioned around “convenience” and the ability of each group to occupy administrative and economic niches in the empire’s affairs, wherein a group that performed well in its niche tasks would gain more status than another, less effective group. Around the early 18th century, the convenience model broke down such that administrative and military posts were mostly occupied by upper-middle class Muslim citizens.

== Gender ==
=== Women as legal entities ===
Unlike many European societies of the same period, women in the Ottoman Empire were considered legal entities and subjects distinct from their husbands or fathers. They had the ability to maintain control over their property and assets after marriage. Women had the ability to inherit property from male relatives and could claim property in the instance of divorce. In many instances, however, male relatives interfered with a woman’s control over her assets, thereby limiting legal autonomy. The extent to which women controlled property varied in different areas of the empire as well. The central government tended to confiscate and redistribute the land of widowed peasants without sons to maintain agricultural productivity.

=== Marriage ===
Islamic tradition viewed women’s sexuality as a force that needed to be controlled by a man, typically a father or husband. Marriages were typically arranged by the parents of young men and women. The process of arranged marriage was initiated by a young man’s father, who sought out young women or girls who could enhance the family’s socioeconomic status. The prospective bride had little to no agency regarding marriage. Even in the acceptance of a dowry, the bride was represented by a male relative. Upon marriage, a wife’s “duty” was to show her husband obedience, while the husband took responsibility for all the household’s finances and public relations. While a woman in the Ottoman Empire could not initiate the legal process of divorce without the permission of her husband, she did have the ability to seek an annulment. Divorced individuals typically remarried, however women had more restrictions in this process, including having to wait “three menstrual courses” before entering a new marriage.

=== Public and private spaces ===
The Ottoman Empire was patriarchal in structure, and separation of the sexes was common in public places. Typically, men in the Ottoman Empire controlled public spaces, while women could hold power in private spaces, such as the home. Outside the home, men did not walk beside their female relatives, and women could not leave the home between sunset and sunrise. In most public spaces, different clothing was used to delineate between social groups; the differences in clothing were especially prominent between men and women. Notably, women wore veils starting from the onset of puberty in public places. Within the privacy of the home, women were responsible for nearly all domestic activities. The ability to perform household duties well was a marker of obedient and faithful wives. Family structure was highly patriarchal for peasants, with the husband viewed as the head and taxpayer of the family unit. Men were responsible for working the land and acting as representatives for their families in public settings, while child-rearing and domestic work were the responsibility of peasant women.

=== Prostitution ===
Prostitution was one way women had increased visibility and power in public spaces. The history of prostitution in Ottoman society is complex, with various attempts by the government to regulate or ban the profession. Prostitutes were more likely to be women of lower socioeconomic status or women from less prominent family lineages. While there were laws that dictated harsh punishments for convicted prostitutes, the most common consequence for a prostitute was removal from the neighborhood.

== Urban and rural areas ==
Ottoman society was divided into two major classes. The askeri was the ruling class, while the reaya, or “the flock,” was composed of the lower classes. The reaya included craftsmen and merchants in urban areas; however, the largest social group in the Ottoman Empire were rural farmers. While nomadic groups existed throughout the empire’s entire existence, the central government often attempted to get such groups to settle and farm land. In doing so, they would be required to pay taxes to the central government and were eligible to be recruited to the Ottoman military.

=== Urban areas and cities ===
Large urban centers within the Ottoman Empire held the best educational opportunities. The madrasa system in the empire provided young Muslim men with education, providing a potential opportunity to have a high ranking position in the legal, religious, educational or bureaucratic fields. Those educated in madrasas outside of a major city were often ranked lower than those educated in cities, therefore the internal provinces tended to attract the majority of Ottoman students.

In cities, merchants and craftsmen were ranked below the ruling class and divided into guilds to manage the local commercial industry. City life outside of the sultan’s palace centered around marketplaces and bazaars, in which people of many religions, ethnicities, and financial classes would interact. While guilds were originally organized to benefit artisans and merchants, the government wished to control the production and distribution of goods. Therefore, the state had a relatively large amount of control over urban guilds and even viewed them as a “means of controlling” a city’s population and activity. While craftsmanship and commerce was centered in cities, these industries relied on peasant farmers to provide raw materials and other necessary goods. However, it was rare that crafted goods were exported to rural towns and villages, as most peasants could not afford to travel or purchase them.

=== Rural areas ===
All farmland in the empire was deemed to belong to the current ruler, therefore the central government organized and controlled peasant land and the agricultural economy. While they did not own their land, peasant farmers were considered “hereditary tenants” of the land they worked. Peasant land was passed from father to son as an inheritance. All rural communities had a sipahi, a representative of the government to whom peasant households paid taxes. The sipahi did not live in the village he represented. Rather, a local village headman served as the main connection between his village and the urban government.

== Slavery ==
The status of “slave” in the Ottoman Empire was a very broad category and could encompass many different kinds of activities and social positions. Though generally defined in Islamic terms as a person being granted ownership over another person and their labor, property, and sexuality, slavery in the Ottoman context was more complex than a simple divide between free men and women and enslaved people. In fact, slavery did not equate a lower status than the rest of the population: not only did male slaves in the bureaucratic and military spheres and the females in elite harems have much more influence over the state’s affairs than most people did, but even some common domestic workers were better fed, clothed, and protected than many freed men.

Slavery, much like other social divisions, evolved over time. The kul system for instance, a class of enslaved people doing administrative work, was challenged by the increasing number of free Muslims entering government service: having to accommodate, the kuls began recruiting rather than enslaving and could thus not be referred to as an enslaved class anymore. In 1855, slavery was even abolished to appease liberal concerns in Europe, though in practice, the institution persisted until 1905.

Opportunities for social mobility were more numerous within the Ottoman Empire as opposed to many European societies during the time. Possibilities existed for those of modest origin to rise in sociopolitical rank and even enter the ruling class. Manumission of enslaved men was normalized in the empire after an individual had served his owner for a predetermined period of time. The devshirme system was another aspect of slavery that enabled social mobility for a small group of individuals. In this system, young Christian boys would be sold into slavery, converted to Islam, and educated, all with the goal of assuming a high government post upon the completion of their training.

== Bibliography ==
- Hourani, Albert Habib (1991). A History of the Arab Peoples. Cambridge, Massachusetts: Belknap Press of Harvard University Press. ISBN 9780674395657.
