= Alexandru Macedonski =

Romanian poet, novelist, dramatist and literary critic (1854–1920)

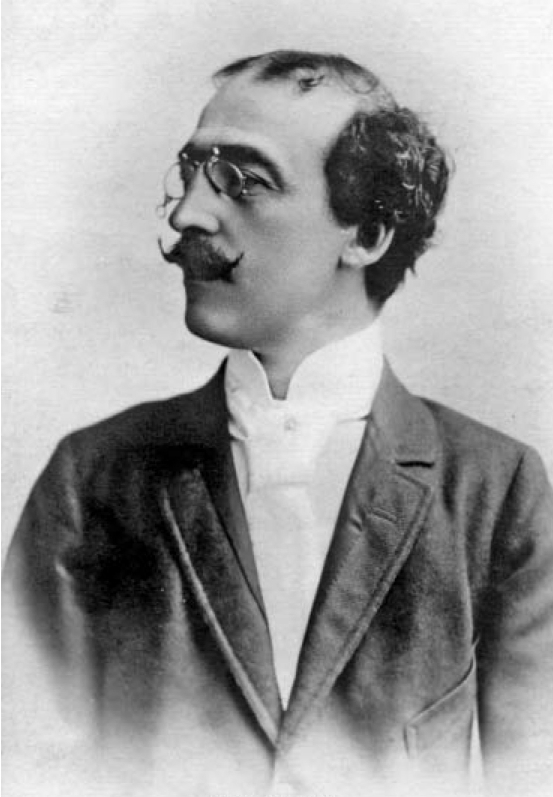
- Born: 14 March 1854; Bucharest, Wallachia
- Died: 24 November 1920 (aged 66); Bucharest, Kingdom of Romania
- Occupations: Poet, novelist, short story writer, literary critic, journalist, translator, civil servant
- Writing career
- Pen name: Duna, Luciliu, Sallustiu
- Period: 1866–1920
- Genres: Lyric poetry, rondel, ballade, ode, sonnet, epigram, epic poetry, pastoral, free verse, prose poetry, fantasy, novella, sketch story, fable, verse drama, tragedy, comedy, tragicomedy, morality play, satire, erotic literature, essay, memoir, biography, travel writing, science fiction
- Movements: Neoromanticism, Parnassianism, Symbolism, Realism, Naturalism, Neoclassicism, Literatorul

Alexandru Macedonski (Romanian pronunciation: [alekˈsandru mat͡ʃeˈdonski]; also rendered as Al. A. Macedonski, Macedonschi or Macedonsky; 14 March 1854 – 24 November 1920) was a Romanian poet, novelist, dramatist and literary critic, known especially for having promoted lots of French Symbolism in his native country, and for leading the Romanian Symbolist movement during its early decades. A forerunner of local modernist literature, he is the first local author to have used free verse, and claimed by some to have been the first in modern European literature. Within the framework of Romanian literature, Macedonski is seen by critics as second only to national poet Mihai Eminescu; as leader of a cosmopolitan and aestheticist trend formed around his Literatorul journal, he was diametrically opposed to the inward-looking traditionalism of Eminescu and his school.

Debuting as a Neoromantic in the Wallachian tradition, Macedonski went through the Realist-Naturalist stage deemed "social poetry", while progressively adapting his style to Symbolism and Parnassianism, and repeatedly but unsuccessfully attempting to impose himself in the Francophone world. Despite having theorized "instrumentalism", which reacted against the traditional guidelines of poetry, he maintained a lifelong connection with Neoclassicism and its ideal of purity. Macedonski's quest for excellence found its foremost expression in his recurring motif of life as a pilgrimage to Mecca, notably used in his critically acclaimed Nights cycle. The stylistic stages of his career are reflected in the collections Prima verba, Poezii, and Excelsior, as well as in the fantasy novel Thalassa, Le Calvaire de feu. In old age, he became the author of rondels, noted for their detached and serene vision of life, in contrast with his earlier combativeness.

In parallel to his literary career, Macedonski was a civil servant, notably serving as prefect in the Budjak and Northern Dobruja during the late 1870s. As journalist and militant, his allegiance fluctuated between the liberal current and conservatism, becoming involved in polemics and controversies of the day. Of the long series of publications he founded, Literatorul was the most influential, notably hosting his early conflicts with the Junimea literary society. These targeted Vasile Alecsandri and especially Eminescu, their context and tone becoming the cause of a major rift between Macedonski and his public. This situation repeated itself in later years, when Macedonski and his Forța Morală magazine began campaigning against the Junimist dramatist Ion Luca Caragiale, whom they falsely accused of plagiarism. During World War I, the poet aggravated his critics by supporting the Central Powers against Romania's alliance with the Entente side. His biography was also marked by an enduring interest in esotericism, numerous attempts to become recognized as an inventor, and an enthusiasm for cycling.

The scion of a political and aristocratic family, the poet was the son of General Alexandru Macedonski, who served as Defense Minister, and the grandson of 1821 rebel Dimitrie Macedonski. Both his son Alexis and grandson Soare were known painters.

== Biography ==
=== Early life and family ===
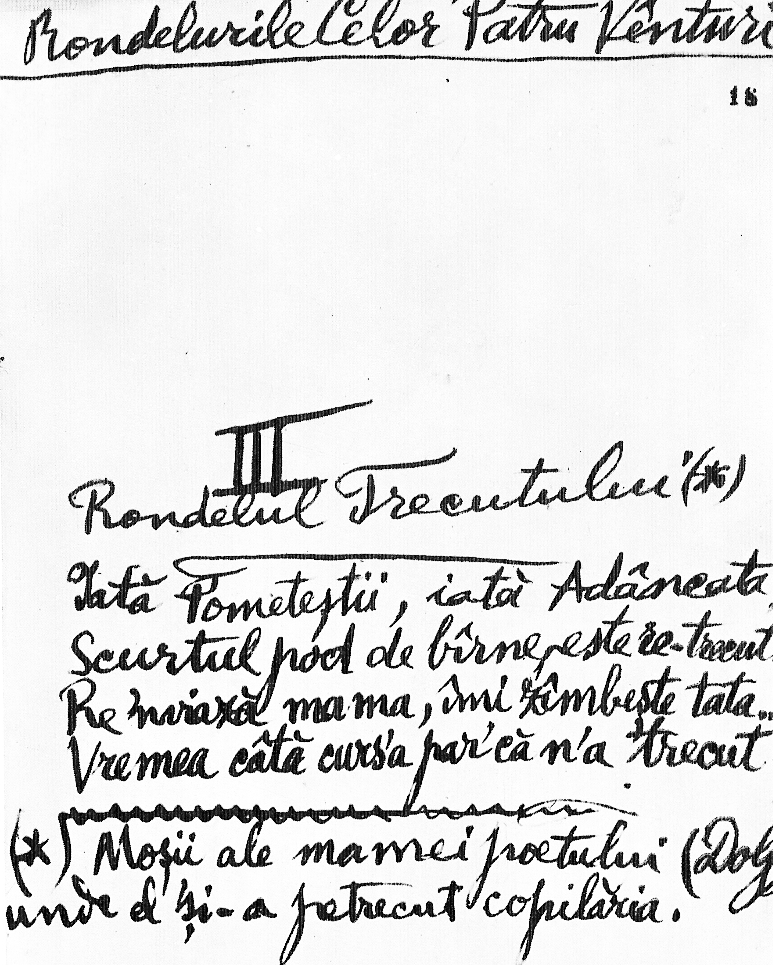
Manuscript version for one of Macedonski's late poems, referencing his family's estates on the Amaradia Valley

The poet's paternal family had arrived in Wallachia during the early 19th century. Of South Slav origin per George Călinescu they were descended from Serb insurgents in Ottoman-ruled Macedonia. However, according to Radu Florescu they were of Bulgarian origin. Per Romanian historian Constantin Velichi his grandfather was as a Bulgarian who later became Romanianized.

Alexandru's grandfather Dimitrie and Dimitrie's brother Pavel participated in the 1821 uprising against the Phanariote administration, and in alliance with the Filiki Eteria; Dimitrie made the object of controversy when, during the final stage of the revolt, he sided with the Eteria in its confrontation with Wallachian leader Tudor Vladimirescu, taking an active part in the latter's killing. Both Macedonski brothers had careers in the Wallachian military forces, at a time when the country was governed by Imperial Russian envoys, when the Regulamentul Organic regime recognized the family as belonging to Wallachia's nobility. Dimitrie married Zoe, the daughter an ethnic Russian or Polish officer; their son, the Russian-educated Alexandru, climbed in the military and political hierarchy, joining the unified Land Forces after his political ally, Alexander John Cuza, was elected Domnitor and the two Danubian Principalities became united Romania. Both the officer's uncle Pavel and brother Mihail were amateur poets.

Macedonski's mother, Maria Fisența (also Vicenț or Vicența), was from an aristocratic environment, being the scion of Oltenian boyars. Through her father, she may have descended from Russian immigrants who had been absorbed into Oltenia's nobility. Maria had been adopted by the boyar Dumitrache Pârâianu, and the couple had inherited the Adâncata and Pometești estates in Goiești, on the Amaradia Valley.

Both the poet and his father were dissatisfied with accounts of their lineage, contradicting them with an account that researchers have come to consider spurious. Although adherents of the Romanian Orthodox Church, the Macedonskis traced their origin to Rogala-bearing Lithuanian nobility from the defunct Polish–Lithuanian Commonwealth. While the writer perpetuated his father's claim, it is possible that he also took pride in investigating his Balkan roots: according to literary historian Tudor Vianu, who, as a youth, was a member of his circle, this tendency is attested by two of Macedonski's poems from the 1880s, where the South Slavs appear as icons of freedom. Vianu's contemporary, literary historian George Călinescu, postulated that, although the family had been absorbed into the ethnic and cultural majority, the poet's origin served to enrich local culture by linking it to a "Thracian" tradition and the spirit of "adventurers".

The family moved often, following General Macedonski's postings. Born on 14 March 1854, in Bucharest, Macedonski-son was the third of four siblings, the oldest of whom was a daughter, Caterina. Before the age of six, he was a sickly and nervous child, who is reported to have had regular tantrums. In 1862, his father sent him to school in Oltenia, and he spent most time in the Amaradia region. The nostalgia he felt for the landscape later made him consider writing an Amărăzene ("Amaradians") cycle, of which only one poem was ever completed. He was attending the Carol I High School in Craiova and, according to his official record, graduated in 1867.

Macedonski's father had by then become known as an authoritarian commander, and, during his time in Târgu Ocna, faced a mutiny which only his wife could stop by pleading with the soldiers (an episode which made an impression on the future poet). A stern parent, he took an active part in educating his children. Having briefly served as Defense Minister, the general was mysteriously dismissed by Cuza in 1863, and his pension became the topic of a political scandal. It ended only under the rule of Carol I, Cuza's Hohenzollern successor, when Parliament voted against increasing the sum to the level demanded by its recipient. Having preserved a negative impression of the 1866 plebiscite, during which Cuza's dethronement had been confirmed, Macedonski remained a committed opponent of the new ruler. As a youth and adult, he sought to revive his father's cause, and included allusions to the perceived injustice in at least one poem. After spending the last months of his life protesting against the authorities, Macedonski-father fell ill and died in September 1869, leaving his family to speculate that he had been murdered by political rivals.

=== Debut years ===
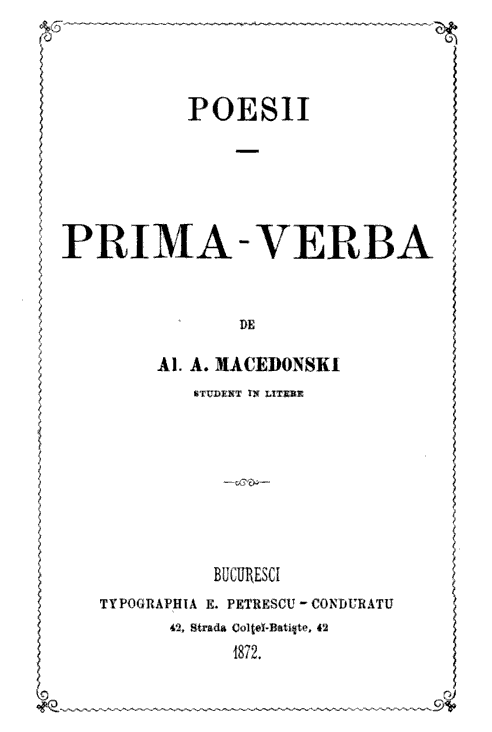
First page of Prima verba, 1872

Macedonski left Romania in 1870, traveling through Austria-Hungary and spending time in Vienna, before visiting Switzerland and possibly other countries; according to one account, it was here that he may have first met (and disliked) his rival poet Mihai Eminescu, at a time a Viennese student. Macedonski's visit was meant to be preparation for entering the University of Bucharest, but he spent much of his time in the bohemian environment, seeking entertainment and engaging in romantic escapades. He was however opposed to the lifestyle choices of people his age, claiming that they were engaged in "orgy after orgy". At around that date, the young author had begun to perfect a style heavily influenced by Romanticism, and in particular by his Wallachian predecessors Dimitrie Bolintineanu and Ion Heliade Rădulescu. He was for a while in Styria, at Bad Gleichenberg, a stay which, George Călinescu believes, may have been the result of a medical recommendation to help him counter excessive nervousness. The landscape there inspired him to write an ode. Also in 1870, he published his first lyrics in George Bariț's Transylvanian-based journal Telegraful Român.

The following year, he left for Italy, where he visited Pisa, Florence, Venice, and possibly other cities. His records of the journey indicate that he was faced with financial difficulties and plagued by disease. Macedonski also claimed to have attended college lectures in these cities, and to have spent significant time studying at Pisa University, but this remains uncertain. He eventually returned to Bucharest, where he entered the Faculty of Letters (which he never attended regularly). According to Călinescu, Macedonski "did not feel the need" to attend classes, because "such a young man will expect society to render upon him its homages." He was again in Italy during spring 1872, soon after publishing his debut volume Prima verba (Latin for "First Word"). Having also written an anti-Carol piece, published in Telegraful Român during 1873, Macedonski reportedly feared political reprisals, and decided to make another visit to Styria and Italy while his case was being assessed. It was in Italy that he met French musicologist Jules Combarieu, with whom he corresponded sporadically over the following decades.

During that period, Macedonski became interested in the political scene and political journalism, first as a sympathizer of the liberal-radical current—which, in 1875, organized itself around the National Liberal Party. In 1874, back in Craiova, Macedonski founded a short-lived literary society known as Junimea, a title which purposefully or unwittingly copied that of the influential conservative association with whom he would later quarrel. It was then that he met journalist and pedagogue Ștefan Velescu, a meeting witnessed by Velescu's pupil, the future liberal journalist Constantin Bacalbașa, who recorded it in his memoirs. Oltul magazine, which he had helped establish and which displayed a liberal agenda, continued to be published until July 1875, and featured Macedonski's translations from Pierre-Jean de Béranger, Hector de Charlieu and Alphonse de Lamartine, as well as his debut in travel writing and short story. At age 22, he worked on his first play, a comedy titled Gemenii ("The Twins"). In 1874 that he came to the attention of young journalist future dramatist Ion Luca Caragiale, who satirized him in articles for the magazine Ghimpele, ridiculing his claim to Lithuanian descent, and eventually turning him into the character Aamsky, whose fictional career ends with his death from exhaustion caused by contributing to "for the country's political development". This was the first episode in a consuming polemic between the two figures. Reflecting back on this period in 1892, Macedonski described Caragiale as a "noisy young man" of "sophistic reasoning", whose target audience was to be found in "beer gardens".

=== 1875 trial and office as prefect ===
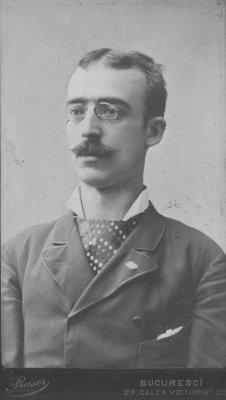
1878 photograph of Macedonski

In March 1875, Macedonski was arrested on charges of defamation or sedition. For almost a year before, he and Oltul had taken an active part in the campaign against Conservative Party and its leader, Premier Lascăr Catargiu. In this context, he had demanded that the common man "rise up with weapons in their hands and break both the government agents and the government", following up with similar messages aimed at the Domnitor. He was taken to Bucharest's Văcărești Prison and confined there for almost three months. Supported by the liberal press and defended by the most prestigious pro-liberal attorneys (Nicolae Fleva among them), Macedonski faced a jury trial on 7 June, being eventually cleared of the charges. Reportedly, the Bucharest populace organized a spontaneous celebration of the verdict.

In 1875, after the National Liberal Ioan Emanoil Florescu was assigned the post of Premier by Carol, Macedonski embarked on an administrative career. The poet was upset by not being included on the National Liberal list for the 1875 suffrage. This disenchantment led him into a brief conflict with the young liberal figure Bonifaciu Florescu, only to join him soon afterward in editing Stindardul journal, alongside Pantazi Ghica and George Fălcoianu. The publication followed the line of Nicolae Moret Blaremberg, made notorious for his radical and republican agenda. Ghica and Macedonski remained close friends until Ghica's 1882 death.

The new cabinet eventually appointed him Prefect of Bolgrad region, in the Budjak (at the time part of Romania). In parallel, he published his first translation, a version of Parisina, an 1816 epic poem by Lord Byron, and completed the original works Ithalo and Calul arabului ("The Arab's Horse"). He also spoke at the Romanian Atheneum, presenting his views on the state of Romanian literature (1878). His time in office ended upon the outbreak of the Russo-Turkish War. At the time, Russian volunteers were amassed on the Budjak border, requesting from the Romanian authorities the right of free passage into the Principality of Serbia. The National Liberal Premier Ion Brătianu, who was negotiating an anti-Ottoman alliance, sent Macedonski signals to let them pass, but the prefect, obeying the official recommendation of Internal Affairs Minister George D. Vernescu, decided against it, and was consequently stripped of his office.

Still determined to pursue a career in the press, Macedonski founded a string of unsuccessful magazines with patriotic content and titles such as Vestea ("The Announcement"), Dunărea ("The Danube"), Fulgerul ("The Lightning") and, after 1880, Tarara (an onomatopoeia equivalent to "Toodoodoo"). Their history is connected with that of the Russo-Turkish War, at the end of which Romanian participation on the Russian side resulted in her independence. Macedonski remained committed to the anti-Ottoman cause, and, some thirty years later, stated: "We want no Turkey in Europe!"

By 1879, the poet, who continued to voice criticism of Carol, had several times switched sides between the National Liberals and the opposition Conservatives. That year, while the Budjak was ceded to Russia and Northern Dobruja was integrated into Romania, the Brătianu cabinet appointed him administrator of the Sulina plasă and the Danube Delta. He had previously refused to be made comptroller in Putna County, believing such an appointment to be beneath his capacity, and had lost a National Liberal appointment in Silistra when Southern Dobruja was granted to the Principality of Bulgaria. During this short interval in office, he traveled to the Snake Island in the Black Sea—his appreciation for the place later motivated him to write the fantasy novel Thalassa, Le Calvaire de feu and the poem Lewki.

=== Early Literatorul years ===
With the 1880s came a turning point in Alexandru Macedonski's career. Vianu notes that changes took place in the poet's relationship with his public: "Society recognizes in him the nonconformist. [...] The man becomes singular; people start talking about his oddities." Macedonski's presumed frustration at being perceived in this way, Vianu notes, may have led him closer to the idea of poète maudit, theorized earlier by Paul Verlaine. In this context, he had set his sight on promoting "social poetry", the merger between lyricism and political militantism. Meanwhile, according to Călinescu, his attacks on the liberals and the "daft insults he aimed at [Romania's] throne" had effectively ruined his own chance of political advancement.

In January 1880, he launched his most influential and long-lived publication, Literatorul, which was also the focal point of his eclectic cultural circle, and, in later years, of the local Symbolist school. In its first version, the magazine was co-edited by Macedonski, Bonifaciu Florescu and poet Th. M. Stoenescu. Florescu parted with the group soon after, due to a disagreement with Macedonski, and was later attacked by the latter for allegedly accumulating academic posts. Literatorul aimed to irritate Junimist sensibilities from its first issue, when it stated its dislike for "political prejudice in literature." This was most likely an allusion to the views of Junimist figure Titu Maiorescu, being later accompanied by explicit attacks on him and his followers. An early success for the new journal was the warm reception it received from Vasile Alecsandri, a Romantic poet and occasional Junimist whom Macedonski idolized at the time, and the collaboration of popular memoirist Gheorghe Sion. Another such figure was the intellectual V. A. Urechia, whom Macedonski made president of the Literatorul Society. In 1881, Education Minister Urechia granted Macedonski the Bene-Merenti medal 1st class, although, Călinescu stresses, the poet had only totaled 18 months of public service. At around that time, Macedonski had allegedly begun courting actress Aristizza Romanescu, who rejected his advances, leaving him unenthusiastic about love matters and unwilling to seek female company.

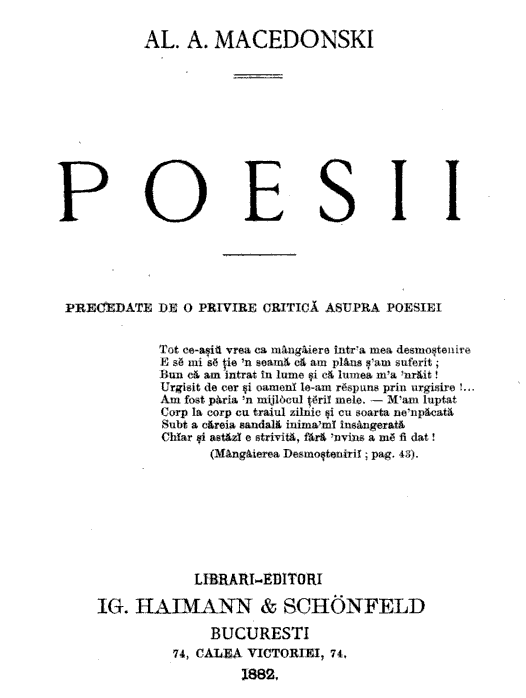
First page of Poesii, 1882

In parallel, Macedonski used the magazine to publicize his disagreement with the main Junimist voice, Convorbiri Literare. Among the group of contributors, several had already been victims of Maiorescu's irony: Sion, Urechia, Pantazi Ghica and Petru Grădișteanu. While welcoming the debut of its contributor, Parnassian-Neoclassicist novelist and poet Duiliu Zamfirescu, Macedonski repeatedly attacked its main exponent, the conservative poet Eminescu, claiming not to understand his poetry. However, Literatorul was also open to contributions from some Convorbiri Literare affiliates (Zamfirescu, Matilda Cugler-Poni and Veronica Micle).

In November 1880, Macedonski's plays Iadeș! ("Wishbone!", a comedy first printed in 1882) and Unchiașul Sărăcie ("Old Man Poverty") premiered at the National Theatre Bucharest. A sign of government approval, this was followed by Macedonski's appointment to a minor administrative office, as Historical Monuments Inspector. Nevertheless, both plays failed to impose themselves on public perception, and were withdrawn from the program by 1888. Călinescu asserts that, although Macedonski later claimed to have always been facing poverty, his job in the administration, coupled with other sources of revenue, ensured him a comfortable existence.

In 1881, Macedonski published a new collection of poetry. Titled Poezii, it carries the year "1882" on its original cover. Again moving away from liberalism, Macedonski sought to make himself accepted by Junimea and Maiorescu. He consequently attended the Junimea sessions, and gave a public reading of Noaptea de noiembrie ("November Night"), the first publicized piece in his lifelong Nights cycle. It reportedly earned him the praise of historian and poet Bogdan Petriceicu Hasdeu, who, although an anti-Junimist, happened to be in the audience. Despite rumors according to which he had applauded Macedonski, Maiorescu himself was not impressed, and left an unenthusiastic account of the event in his private diary.

=== Against Alecsandri and Eminescu ===
Macedonski's open conflict with Junimea began in 1882, when he engaged in a publicized polemic with Alecsandri. It was ignited when, through Macedonski's articles, Literatorul criticized Alecsandri for accepting Romanian Academy prizes despite being its member, and later involved Sion (whose replies on behalf of the academy were derided by Macedonski). Macedonski also took distance from Alecsandri's style, publishing a "critical analysis" of his poetry in one issue of Literatorul. In turn, Alecsandri humiliated his young rival by portraying him as Zoilus, the prototype of slanderers, and himself as the model poet Horace in the 1883 play Fântâna Blanduziei. The two were eventually reconciled, and Macedonski again spoke of Alecsandri as his ideological and stylistic predecessor.

In April 1882, Eminescu had also replied to Macedonski in Timpul journal, referring to an unnamed poet who "barely finishes high-school, comes over to Bucharest selling nick-nacks and makeup [and goes into] literary dealership". Reproaching Macedonski's attacks on Alecsandri, Eminescu makes a nationalist comment about the young poet bearing "the bastard instincts of those foreigners who were Romanianized only yesterday", and attributes him "the physiognomy of a hairdresser". Through the articles of Petru Th. Missir, Convorbiri Literare gave Poezii a negative review, deemed "malevolent" by literary historian Mircea Anghelescu. At the other end of the political and cultural spectrum, Macedonski faced opposition from the intellectuals attracted to socialism, in particular Contemporanul editors Constantin Mille and Ioan Nădejde, with whom he was engaged in an extended polemic.

In the meantime, Macedonski published his own play, which had Cuza for its main character and was eponymously titled Cuza-Vodă, and completed translations for Literatorul—from Maurice Rollinat, whom he helped impose as a main cultural reference in Romanian Symbolism, and from the Greek poet Akhillefs Paraskhos. In 1883, he also contributed his first sketch story, Casa cu nr. 10 ("The House at Number 10"). In early 1883, he married Ana Rallet-Slătineanu. Wealthy and supposedly related to Romanian aristocrats, she would bear him five children in all: the painter Alexis was the eldest, followed by Nikita; the three youngest were two sons (Panel and Constantin Macedonski) and a daughter, Anna (also known as Nina). His heterosexual lifestyle notwithstanding, Macedonski remained a self-avowed admirer of male beauties, and was rumored to be a closeted homosexual.

In July 1883, Macedonski undertook one of his most controversial anti-Junimist actions. That month, Literatorul published an epigram signed with the pseudonym Duna, deriding an unnamed author who had lost his mind. Mihai Eminescu—whom many had already come to see as Romania's national poet—had by then developed a mental disorder which had become known to the general public. Ever since that moment, Macedonski has generally been believed to be Duna, and as a result, was faced with much criticism from both readers and commentators. The intense anti-Literatorul press campaign was initiated in August, when writer Grigore Ventura issued an article condemning Macedonski's attitude (published in the Bucharest-based newspaper L'Indépendance Roumaine), with Macedonski responding in the National Liberal organ Românul. During one evening, Macedonski is reported to have been assaulted by anonymous supporters of Eminescu. His previous conflict with Nădejde was also affected by this renewed controversy: while opposed to Junimist policies, the socialists at Contemporanul voiced their admiration for Eminescu's art.

Late in 1883, Macedonski and his friends unveiled Ion Georgescu's statue of their mentor Bolintineanu in the National Theater lobby. The circumstances in which this took place rose suspicion of foul play; on this grounds, Macedonski was ridiculed by his former friend Zamfirescu in the journal România Liberă, which left him embittered. Călinescu proposes that, although such negative reactions were invoked by Macedonski's supporters as a sign of their mentor having been marginalized, Macedonski had expressed his dissatisfaction with the cultural environment long before that moment, and was still a respected figure even after the incidents took place.

=== First Paris sojourn and Poezia viitorului ===
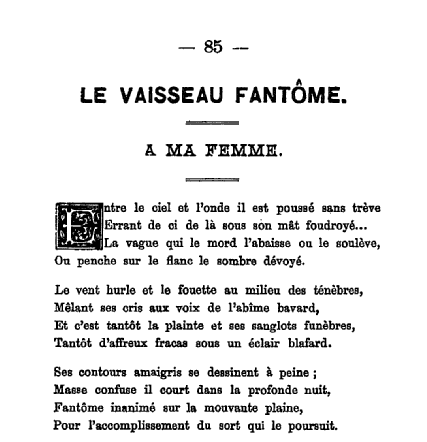
Macedonski's poem Le Vaisseau fantôme ("The Phantom Ship"), as originally published in L'Élan littéraire (February 1885)

Having been stripped of his administrative office by the new Brătianu cabinet, Macedonski faced financial difficulties, and was forced to move into a house on the outskirts of Bucharest, and later moved between houses in northern Bucharest. According to Călinescu, the poet continued to cultivate luxury and passionately invested in the decorative arts, although his source of income, other than the supposed assistance "of [European] ruling houses", remains a mystery. Arguing that Macedonski was "always in need of money" to use on his luxury items, poet Victor Eftimiu claimed: "He did not shy away from sending emphatic notes to the potentates of his day [...], flattering some, threatening others. He would marry off or simply mate some of his disciples with aging and rich women, and then he would squeeze out their assets."

Macedonski eventually left Romania in 1884, visiting Paris. On his way there, he passed through Craiova, where he met aspiring author Traian Demetrescu, whose works he had already hosted in Literatorul and who was to become his friend and protégé. Demetrescu later recalled being gripped by "tremors of emotion" upon first catching sight of Macedonski. In France, Macedonski set up contacts within the French literary environment, and began contributing to French or Francophone literary publications—including the Belgian Symbolist platforms La Wallonie and L'Élan littéraire. His collaboration with La Wallonie alongside Albert Mockel, Tudor Vianu believes, makes Alexandru Macedonski one in the original wave of European Symbolists. This adaptation to Symbolism also drew on his marked Francophilia, which in turn complemented his tendencies toward cosmopolitanism. He became opposed to Carol I, who, in 1881, had been granted the Crown of the Romanian Kingdom. In addition to his admiration for Cuza and the 1848 Wallachian revolutionaries, the poet objected to the King's sympathy for France's main rival, the German Empire. In January 1885, after having returned from the voyage, he announced his retirement from public life, claiming that German influence and its exponents at Junimea had "conquered" Romanian culture, and repeating his claim that Eminescu lacked value.

In the meantime, Literatorul went out of print, although new series were still published at irregular intervals until 1904 (when it ceased being published altogether). The magazine was reportedly hated by the public, causing Macedonski, Stoenescu, Florescu, Urechia and educator Anghel Demetriescu to try to revive it as Revista Literară ("The Literary Review", published for a few months in 1885). The poet attempted to establish other magazines, all of them short-lived, and, in 1887, handed for print his Naturalist novella Dramă banală ("Banal Drama") while completing one of the most revered episodes in the Nights series, Noaptea de mai ("May Night"). Also in 1886, he worked on his other Naturalist novellas: Zi de august ("August Day"), Pe drum de poștă ("On the Stagecoach Trail"), Din carnetul unui dezertor ("From the Notebook of a Deserter"), Între cotețe ("Amidst Hen Houses") and the eponymous Nicu Dereanu.

By 1888, he was again sympathetic toward Blaremberg, whose dissident National Liberal faction had formed an alliance with the Conservatives, editing Stindardul Țărei (later Straja Țărei) as his supporting journal. However, late in the same year, he returned to the liberal mainstream, being assigned a weekly column in Românul newspaper. Two years later, he attempted to relaunch Literatorul under the leadership of liberal figure Bogdan Petriceicu Hasdeu, but the latter eventually settled for founding his own Revista Nouă. Around 1891, he saluted Junimea's own break with the Conservatives and its entry into politics at the Conservative-Constitutional Party, before offering an enthusiastic welcome to the 1892 Junimist agitation among university students. In 1894, he would speak in front of student crowds gathered at a political rally in University Square, and soon after made himself known for supporting the cause of ethnic Romanians and other underrepresented groups of Austria-Hungary.

His literary thesis of the time was titled Poezia viitorului ("The Poetry of the Future"). It upheld Symbolist authors as the models to follow, while Macedonski personally began producing what he referred to as "instrumentalist" poems, composed around musical and onomatopoeic elements, and showing a preference for internal rhymes. Such an experimental approach was soon after parodied and ridiculed by Ion Luca Caragiale, who had by then affiliated and parted with Junimea, in his new Moftul Român magazine. The poet sought to reconcile with his rival, publicizing a claim that Caragiale was being unjustly ignored by the cultural establishment, but this attempt failed to mend relations between them, and the conflict escalated further.

While, in 1893, Literatorul hosted fragments of Thalassa in its Romanian-language version, the author also launched a daily, Lumina ("The Light"). It was also at that stage that Alexandru Macedonski associated with Cincinat Pavelescu, the noted epigrammarian, who joined him in editing Literatorul, and with whom he co-authored the 1893 verse tragedy depicting the Biblical hero Saul, and named after him. Although showcased by the National Theater with star actor Constantin Nottara in the title role, it failed to register success with the public. Two years later, the two Literatorul editors made headlines as pioneers of cycling. An enthusiastic promoter of the sport, Macedonski joined fellow poet Constantin Cantilli on a marathon, pedaling from Bucharest across the border into Austria-Hungary, all the way down to Brașov.

=== Late 1890s ===
Macedonski also returned with a new volume of poetry, Excelsior (consecutive editions in 1895 and 1896), and founded Liga Ortodoxă ("The Orthodox League"), a magazine noted for hosting the debut of Tudor Arghezi, later one of the most celebrated figures in Romanian literature. Macedonski commended his new protégé for reaching "the summit of poetry and art" at "an age when I was still prattling verses". Liga Ortodoxă also hosted articles against Caragiale, which Macedonski signed with the pseudonym Sallustiu ("Sallustius"). The magazine was additional proof of Macedonski's return to conservatism, and largely dedicated to defending the cause of Romanian Orthodox Metropolitan Ghenadie, deposed by the Romanian Synod following a political scandal. It defended Ghenadie up until he chose to resign, and subsequently went out of print. Macedonski was shocked to note that Ghenadie had given up his own defense.

In 1895, his Casa cu nr. 10 was translated into French by the Journal des Débats, whose editors reportedly found it picturesque. Two years later, Macedonski himself published French-language translations of his earlier poetry under the title Bronzes, a volume prefaced by his disciple, the critic and promoter Alexandru Bogdan-Pitești. Although it was positively reviewed by Mercure de France magazine, Bronzes was largely unnoticed by the French audience, a fact which Tudor Vianu attributes to Bogdan-Pitești's lack of qualification for the cultural mission Macedonski had trusted him with. By that time, his circle had come to be frequented with regularity by Bogdan-Pitești's friend and collaborator, the celebrated painter Ștefan Luchian, who was in the Symbolist and Art Nouveau stage of his career.

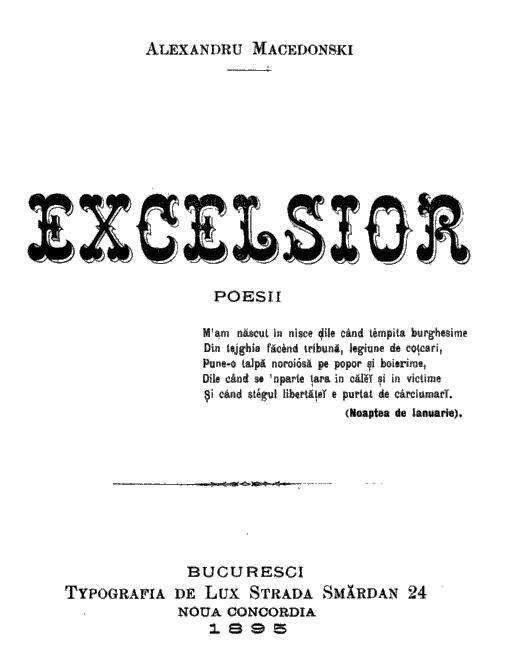
First page of Excelsior, 1895

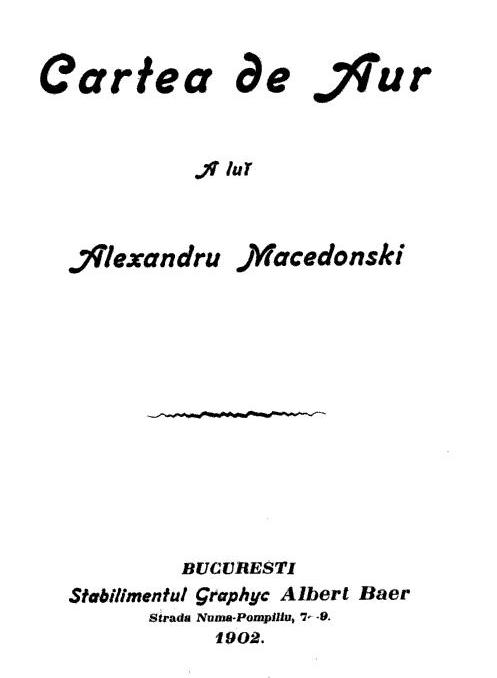
First page of Cartea de aur, 1902

By 1898, Macedonski was again facing financial difficulties, and his collaborators resorted to organizing a fundraiser in his honor. His rejection of the Orthodox establishment was documented by his political tract, published that year as Falimentul clerului ortodox. Between that time and 1900, he focused on researching esoteric, occult and pseudoscientific subjects. Traian Demetrescu, who recorded his visits with Macedonski, recalled his former mentor being opposed to his positivist take on science, claiming to explain the workings of the Universe in "a different way", through "imagination", but also taking an interest in Camille Flammarion's astronomy studies. Macedonski was determined to interpret death through parapsychological means, and, in 1900, conferenced at the Atheneum on the subject Sufletul și viața viitoare ("The Soul and the Coming Life"). The focal point of his vision was that man could voluntarily stave off death with words and gestures, a concept he elaborated upon in his later articles. In one such piece, Macedonski argued: "man has the power [...] to compact the energy currents known as thoughts to the point where he changes them, according to his own will, into objects or soul-bearing creatures." He also attempted to build a machine for extinguishing chimney fires. Later, Nikita Macedonski registered the invention of nacre-treated paper, which is sometimes attributed to his father.

=== Caion scandal and expatriation ===
The few issues of Literatorul that were printed in 1899-1900 saw the circle being joined by the young Symbolist poet Ștefan Petică. In 1902, he published Cartea de aur ("The Golden Book"), comprising his sketch stories and novellas. In parallel, Macedonski returned to the public scene, founding Forța Morală magazine. It was through this venue that he began responding to Ion Luca Caragiale's earlier attacks. This he did by hosting the articles of aspiring journalist Constantin Al. Ionescu-Caion, who accused Caragiale of having plagiarized a Hungarian author by the name of Kemény in his tragedy play Năpasta. Kemény turned out to be non-existent. According to Vianu, Macedonski had no prior knowledge of the fraud, but had also been "blinded" by his resentments instead of displaying "discernment", and had even showed evidence of "insanity". Most in Macedonski's own series of anti-Caragiale articles were unsigned, or signed with pseudonyms such as Luciliu ("Gaius Lucilius").

Like in the case of Eminescu's conflict with Macedonski, the polemic enlisted a negative response from the public. The poet's associate Th. M. Stoenescu convinced himself that Caragiale was being framed, and refused to allow Revista Literară to be used for endorsing Caion, which caused Macedonski to shun him. Macedonski refused to withdraw his support for the cause even after Caragiale sued Caion, but Forța Morală soon went out of print. Before it did so, the journal hosted some of Macedonski's most renowned poems, including Lewki and Noaptea de decemvrie ("December Night"), together with his article on Remy de Gourmont's thoughts on poetics.

In his article of 1903, titled Spre ocultism. Orientări ulterioare spre teozofie și filozofie socială ("Toward Occultism. Later Orientations toward Theosophy and Social Philosophy"), the poet envisaged making his interest in esoteric subjects the basis of a new literary movement. Also that year, poet George Bacovia began attending the literary circle, and gave a reading of his celebrated Plumb poem, being welcomed by Macedonski with a flattering epigram. Macedonski's series of short-lived periodicals resumed in 1905, when he founded Le Beau Danube Bleu (French for "The Beautiful Blue Danube") and Liga Conservatoare ("The Conservative League"). He registered more success in 1906, when his Thalassa was published, as Le Calvaire de feu, by Edward Sansot's Paris-based publishing house. This followed intense self-promotion within the French literary environment, as well as advertisements in the French press. Part of this involved Macedonski sending his book to be reviewed by Émile Faguet, Jean Mounet-Sully, Joséphin Péladan, Pierre Quillard and Jean Richepin, who replied with what Vianu deems "the politeness of circumstance." The volume was nonetheless favorably reviewed by the prestigious magazines Mercure de France and Gil Blas.

Also in 1906, La Revue Musicale published his interview with Combarieu, through which the latter aimed to verify supposed connections between literary inspiration and musical sensitivity. By 1907, he was concentrating on experiments in physics, and eventually publicized his claim to have discovered that light does not travel through vacuum. He sent a paper on astronomy subjects to be reviewed by the Société Astronomique de France, of which he subsequently became a member. The same year, he drafted the plan for a world government, announcing that he had found sympathy for the cause throughout Europe. Macedonski also introduced himself to an Italophone public, when two of his sonnets were published by Poesia, the magazine of Futurist theorist Filippo Tommaso Marinetti.

Between 1910 and 1912, Macedonski was again in Paris. Seeking to withdraw himself from Romania's public life due to what he perceived as injustice, he had by then completed work on the French-language tragicomedy Le Fou? ("The Madman?"), which was only published after his death. He was actively seeking to establish his reputation in French theater, reading his new play to a circle which included Louis de Gonzague Frick and Florian-Parmentier, while, at home, newspapers reported rumors that his work was going to be staged by Sarah Bernhardt's company. His efforts were largely fruitless, and, accompanied by his son Alexis, the poet left France, spent some time in Italy, and eventually returned to Romania. Passing through the German Empire, he learned of Ion Luca Caragiale's sudden death, and wrote Adevărul daily an open letter, which showed that he had come to revise his stance, notably comparing the deceased author's style and legacy to those of Mark Twain.

During Macedonski's absence, his style and work had come to be reviewed more positively, in particular by the young authors I. Dragoslav, Horia Furtună, Ion Pillat, Anastasie Mândru, Al. T. Stamatiad, as well as by post-Junimist critic Mihail Dragomirescu, who offered Macedonski a good reception in his Convorbiri Critice magazine. Tudor Vianu, who cites contemporary statements by Dragoslav, concludes that, upon arrival, Macedonski was enthusiastically received by a public who had missed him. Also in 1912, one of his poems was published as an homage by Simbolul, a magazine published by the young and radical Symbolists Tristan Tzara, Ion Vinea and Marcel Janco. Around that time, Macedonski also collaborated with the Iași-based moderate Symbolist magazine Versuri și Proză. Polemics surrounding his case nevertheless continued: in late 1912, as part of a National Theater adaptation of Alphonse Daudet's Sapho, actor Cazimir Belcot borrowed from Macedonski's appearance and mannerisms to portray a failure.

=== Return and World War I years ===
Macedonski and his protégés had become regular frequenters of Bucharest cafés. Having a table permanently reserved for him at Imperial Hotel's Kübler Coffeehouse, he was later a presence in two other such establishments: High-Life and Terasa Oteteleșanu. He is said to have spent part of his time at Kübler loudly mocking the traditionalist poets who gathered at an opposite table. Meanwhile, the poet's literary club, set up at his house in Dorobanți quarter, had come to resemble a mystical circle, over which he held magisterial command. Vianu, who visited the poet together with Pillat, compares this atmosphere with those created by other "mystics and magi of poetry" (citing as examples Joséphin Péladan, Louis-Nicolas Ménard, Stéphane Mallarmé and Stefan George). The hall where seances were hosted was only lit by candles, and the tables were covered in red fabric. Macedonski himself was seated on a throne designed by Alexis, and adopted a dominant pose. The apparent secrecy and the initiation rites performed on new members were purportedly inspired by Rosicrucianism and the Freemasonry. By then, Macedonski was rewarding his followers' poems with false gemstones.

The poet founded Revista Critică ("The Critical Review"), which again closed after a short while, and issued the poetry volume Flori sacre ("Sacred Flowers"). Grouping his Forța Morală poems and older pieces, it was dedicated to his new generation of followers, whom Macedonski's preface referred to as "the new Romania." He continued to hope that Le Fou? was going to be staged in France, especially after he received some encouragement in the form of articles in Mercure de France and Journal des Débats, but was confronted with the general public's indifference. In 1914, Thalassa was published in a non-definitive version by Constantin Banu's magazine Flacăra, which sought to revive overall interest in his work. At a French Red Cross conference in September, Macedonski paid his final public homage to France, which had just become entangled in World War I. It was also in 1914 that Macedonski commissioned for print his very first rondels and completed work on a tragedy play about Renaissance poet Dante Aligheri—known as La Mort de Dante in its French original, and Moartea lui Dante in the secondary Romanian version (both meaning "Dante's Death"). The aging poet was by then building connections with the local art scene: together with artist Alexandru Severin, he created (and probably presided over) Cenaclul idealist ("The Idealist Club"), which included Symbolist artists and was placed under the honorary patronage of King Carol.

1916 was also the year when Romania abandoned her neutrality and, under a National Liberal government, rallied with the Entente Powers. During the neutrality period, Macedonski had shed his lifelong Francophilia to join the Germanophiles, who wanted to see Romanian participation on the Central Powers' side. In 1915, he issued the journal Cuvântul Meu ("My Word"). Entirely written by him, it published ten consecutive issues before going bankrupt, and notably lashed out against France for being "bourgeois" and "lawyer-filled", demanding from Romania not to get involved in the conflict. Commentators and researchers of his work have declared themselves puzzled by this change in allegiance.

Macedonski further alienated public opinion during the Romanian Campaign, when the Central Powers armies entered southern Romania and occupied Bucharest. Alexis was drafted and became a war artist, but Macedonski Sr, who received formal protection from the Roman Catholic Archdiocese of Bucharest, chose to stay behind while the authorities and many ordinary citizens relocated to Iași, where resistance was still being organized. His stance was interpreted as collaborationism by his critics. However, Macedonski reportedly faced extreme poverty throughout the occupation. Having by then begun to attend the circle of Alexandru Bogdan-Pitești, his promoter and fellow Germanophile, he was once rewarded by the latter with a turkey filled with gold coins.

=== Late polemics, illness and death ===
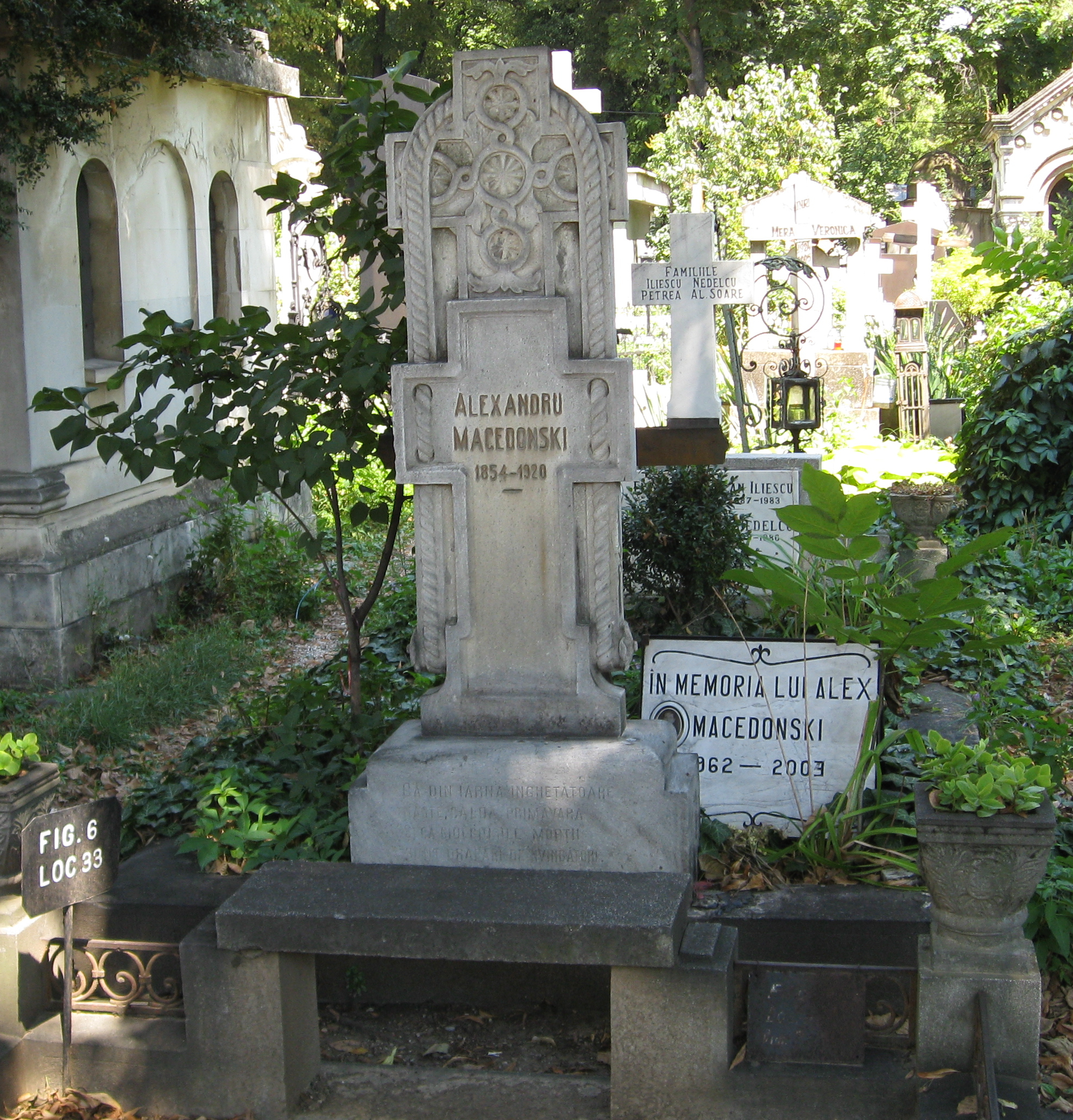
Macedonski's grave in Bellu

Literatorul resumed print in June 1918, once Romania capitulated to the Central Powers under the Treaty of Bucharest. A controversial incident occurred soon afterwards, when, going against the counsel of his friend and collaborator Stamatiad, Macedonski signed a Literatorul article where the German military administrator August von Mackensen, who was about to lead his troops out of Romania, was presented in a positive light. In a manner deemed "excessive" by historian Lucian Boia, the Romanian writer was paying homage not just to Mackensen, but also, indirectly, to German Emperor Wilhelm II and the Reichsheer. Soon after reading the piece, Romanian Academy member and fellow Symbolist promoter Ovid Densusianu withdrew his own nomination of Macedonski for an academy seat. During summer, Macedonski also joined the group of public figures who saluted the senior Conservative Germanophile Petre P. Carp (deeming Carp "the veteran of character, honesty and Romanianism"), and, in September, joined Ioan Slavici and Gala Galaction as a contributor to the occupation magazine Rumänien in Wort und Bild, where he prophesied an anti-French "political renaissance" of Romania.

Alexandru Macedonski faced problems after the Romanian government resumed its control over Bucharest, and during the early years of Greater Romania. What followed the Mackensen article, Vianu claims, was Macedonski's bellum contra omnes ("war against all"). However, the poet made efforts to accommodate himself with the triumphal return of the Iași authorities: in December 1918, Literatorul celebrated the extension of Romanian rule "from the Tisza to the Dniester" as a success of the National Liberals, paying homage to Francophile political leaders Ion I. C. Brătianu and Take Ionescu. Macedonski also envisaged running in the 1918 election for a seat in the new Parliament (which was supposed to vote a document to replace the 1866 Constitution as the organic law), but never registered his candidature. According to Vianu, he had intended to create a joke political party, the "intellectual group", whose other member was an unnamed coffeehouse acquaintance of his. Literatorul was revived for a final time in 1919.

His health deteriorated from heart disease, which is described by Vianu as an effect of constant smoking. By that stage, Vianu recalls, Macedonski also had problems coming to terms with his age. His last anthumous work was the pamphlet Zaherlina (named after the Romanian version of "Zacherlin"; also known as Zacherlina or Zacherlina în continuare, "Zacherlin Contd."), completed in 1919 and published the following year. It notably attacked Densusianu, who had become Macedonski's personal enemy. Some other polemical texts he had authored late in life saw print only after his death, under the title Mustrări postume către o generație neînțelegătoare ("Posthumous Reprimands for an Obtuse Generation").

1920 was also the year when the People's Party cabinet attempted to pension him off from his office at the Historical Monuments Commission, but the publicized protest of Macedonski's fellow writers in Bucharest made it reconsider. Confined to his home by illness and old age, Macedonski was still writing poems, some of which later became known as his Ultima verba ("Last Words"). The writer died on 24 November, at three o'clock in the afternoon. Having come to develop an addiction to floral fragrances, he was inhaling a rose petal extract during his last hours. He was buried in Bucharest's Bellu.

== Work ==
=== General characteristics ===
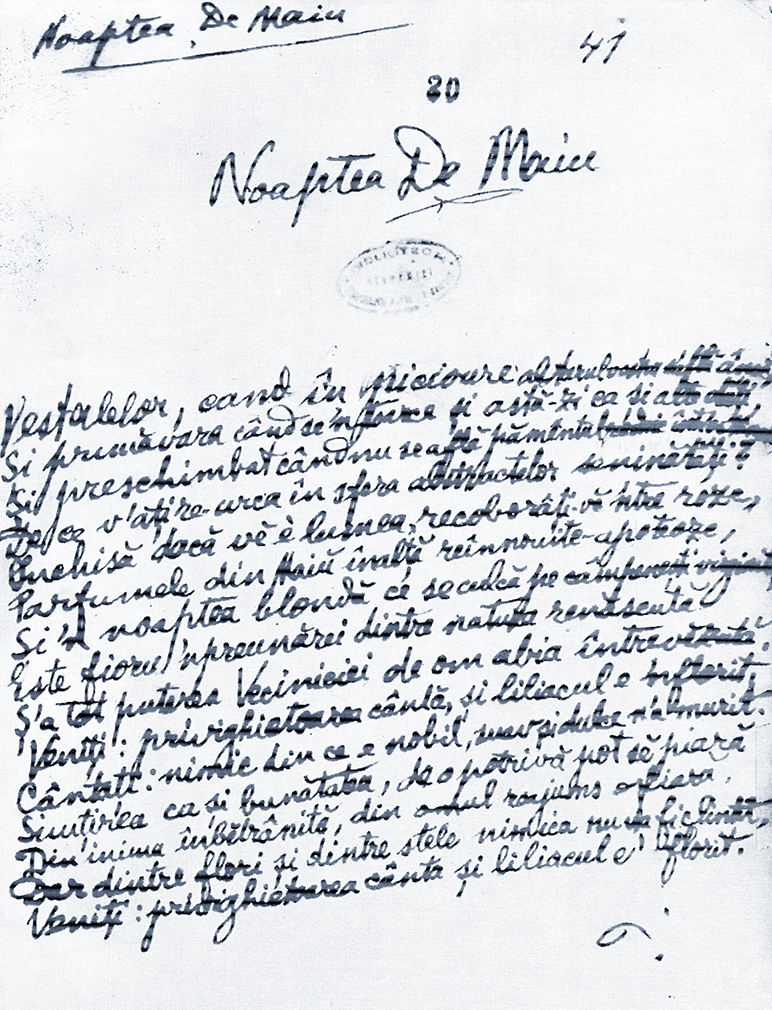
Macedonski's manuscript for Noaptea de mai (in or around 1887)

Although Alexandru Macedonski frequently changed his style and views on literary matters, a number of constants have been traced throughout his work. Thus, a common perception is that his literature had a strongly visual aspect, the notion being condensed in Cincinat Pavelescu's definition of Macedonski: "Poet, therefore painter; painter, therefore poet." Traian Demetrescu too recalled that his mentor had been dreaming of becoming a visual artist, and had eventually settled for turning his son Alexis into one. This pictorial approach to writing created parallels between Macedonski and his traditionalist contemporaries Vasile Alecsandri and Barbu Ștefănescu Delavrancea.

Following the tenets of Dimitrie Bolintineanu and Théophile Gautier, the writer repeatedly called for purity in versification, and upheld it as an essential requirement, while progressively seeking to verify the quality of his poetry through phonaesthetics. A characteristic of Macedonski's style is his inventive use of Romanian. Initially influenced by Ion Heliade Rădulescu's introduction of Italian-based words to the Romanian lexis, Macedonski himself later infused poetic language with a large array of neologisms from several Romance sources. Likewise, Vianu notes, Macedonski had a tendency for comparing nature with the artificial, the result of this being a "document" of his values. Macedonski's language alternated neologisms with barbarisms, many of which were coined by him personally. They include claviculat ("clavicled", applied to a shoulder), împălăriată ("enhatted", used to define a crowd of hat-wearing tourists), and ureichii (instead of urechii, "to the ear" or "of the ear"). His narratives nevertheless take an interest in recording direct speech, used as a method of characterization. However, Călinescu criticizes Macedonski for using a language which, "although grammatically correct [...], seems to have been learned only recently", as well as for not following other Romanian writers in creating a lasting poetic style.

The writer's belief in the effects of sheer willpower, notably present in his comments on esoteric subjects, was itself a defining characteristic of his perspective on literature. In 1882, he wrote about progression in one's career: "We are all poets at birth, but only those who shape themselves through study will become poets." Vianu, who notes Macedonski's "exclusivity" and "fanaticism", places such statements in connection with Macedonski's personal ambition, "pride" and "the willingness to carry out ventured actions [...], in stated opposition with the entire surrounding and with contempt for the foreseeable reaction."

Almost all periods of Macedonski's work reflect, in whole or in part, his public persona and the polemics he was involved in. George Călinescu's emits a verdict on the relation between his lifetime notoriety and the public's actual awareness of his work: "Macedonski [was] a poet well-known for being an unknown poet." According to literary critic Matei Călinescu, the innovative aspects of his impact on Romanian literature were not as much related to his "literary ideology", as much as to his "contradictory spirit" and "essential nonconformism". However, literary researcher Adrian Marino proposes that Macedonski was one of the first modern authors to illustrate the importance of "dialectic unity" through his views on art, in particular by having argued that poetry needed to be driven by "an idea". Having theorized once, while questioning Junimist rigor, that "the logic of poetry is absurdity itself [italics in the original]", the poet also said: "Poetry is the chaos of spirit and matter, of the cries of distress and mad laughter. From the sublime to the trivial, that is what it should be." He later revised part of this verdict, and, making explicit his adoption of aestheticism, spoke against trivial subjects and in favor of the sublime.

While Macedonski also discarded the concept of "social poetry" not long after postulating it, its spirit, Tudor Vianu believes, can still be found in his later contributions. This, the critic notes, was owed to his "social temperament", whose "fundamental experience is that of the social." Discussing this sociable and extrovert character, other critics see in the poet's life and work the imprint of "quixotism". Also according to Vianu, this contrasted with Macedonski's failures in communicating with the public, an experience which made him "misanthropic" and contributed to his ultimate vision of death as freedom. Literary historian Pompiliu Constantinescu concluded: "Macedonski could not resign; his one martyrdom was for Art, as the sole liberation from a tormented life." Other commentators have defined the poet's perspective on life as a result of "neurosis".

In Vianu's perspective, Macedonski's stance is dominated by a mixture of nostalgia, sensuality, lugubrious-grotesque imagery, and "the lack of bashfulness for antisocial sentiments" which complements his sarcasm. In respect to the latter characteristic, Vianu notes "no one in Romanian literature has laughed the same way as Macedonski", whereas critic Ștefan Cazimir argues: "[Macedonski was] lacking the sense of relativity in principles, and implicitly a sense of humor." Cazimir adds: "Only when he aged did [Macedonski] learn to smile". George Călinescu himself believes Macedonski to have been "fundamentally a spiritual man with lots of humor", speculating that he was able to see the "uselessness" of his own scientific ventures.

Critics note that, while Macedonski progressed from one stage to the other, his work fluctuated between artistic accomplishment and mediocrity. Tudor Vianu believes "failure in reaching originality" and reliance on "soppy-conventional attributes of the day" to be especially evident wherever Macedonski tried to emulate epic poetry. He also notes that Macedonski's love-themed pieces "cannot be listed among [his] most fortunate". At his best, commentators note, he was one of the Romanian literature's classics. Macedonski is thus perceived as the author second only to Eminescu, and as his ideal counterpart—a relation Vianu describes as "the internal dualism [confronting] two familiar gods". Various critics have compared Eminescu's poetic discourse with that of the Symbolist leader, concluding that the two poets often display very similar attitudes. Călinescu writes that, while Macedonski's work is largely inferior to that of his Junimist rival, it forms the best "reply" ever conceived within their common setting.

=== Prima verba and other early works ===
With Ion Catina, Vasile Păun and Grigore H. Grandea, young Macedonski belonged to late Romanian Romanticism, part of a Neoromantic generation which had for its mentors Heliade Rădulescu and Bolintineanu. Other early influences were Pierre-Jean de Béranger and Gottfried August Bürger, together with Romanian folklore, motifs from them being adapted by Macedonski into pastorals and ballades of ca. 1870–1880. The imprint of Romanticism and such other sources was evident in Prima verba, which groups pieces that Macedonski authored in his early youth, the earliest of them being written when he was just twelve. Critics generally argue that the volume is without value. The poems display his rebellious attitude, self-victimization and strong reliance on autobiographical elements, centering on such episodes as the death of his father. In one piece inspired by the ideology of Heliade Rădulescu, Vianu notes, Macedonski sings "the French Revolution's love for freedom and equality, otherwise proclaimed from his nobleman's perspective." It reads:

Când acum poporul vedem că studiază
Să nu avem ură când se luminează,
Ca frați să-l iubim!

Translation:

Now that we see the people studying
Let us not be hating them while they grow enlightened,
Let us love them like brothers!

In parallel, Macedonski used erotic themes, completing a series which, although written on the model of idylls, is noted for its brute details of sexual exploits. The poet probably acknowledged that posterity would reject them, and did not republish them in any of his collected poetry volumes.

During his time at Oltul (1873–1875), Macedonski published a series of poems, most of which were not featured in definitive editions of his work. In addition to odes written in the Italian-based version of Romanian, it includes lyrics which satirize Carol I without mentioning his name. Following his arrest, Macedonski also completed Celula mea de la Văcărești ("My Cell in Văcărești"), which shows his attempt to joke about the situation. In contrast to this series, some of the pieces written during Macedonski's time in the Budjak and Northern Dobruja display a detachment from contemporary themes. At that stage, he was especially inspired by Lord Byron, whom Vianu calls "the sovereign poet of [Macedonski's] youth." In Calul arabului, Macedonski explores exotic and Levantine settings, using symbols which announce George Coșbuc's El-Zorab, and the Venetian-themed Ithalo, which centers on episodes of betrayal and murder. Others were epic and patriotic in tone, with subjects such as Romanian victories in the Russo-Turkish War or the Imperial Roman sites along the Danube. One of these pieces, titled Hinov after the village and stone quarry in Rasova, gives Macedonski a claim to being the first modern European poet to have used free verse, ahead of the French Symbolist Gustave Kahn. Macedonski himself later voiced the claim, and referred to such a technique as "symphonic verse", "proteic verse", or, in honor of composer Richard Wagner, "Wagnerian verse".

While editing Oltul, Macedonski also completed his first prose writings. These were the travel account Pompeia și Sorento ("Pompeia and Sorento", 1874) and a prison-themed story described by Vianu as "a tearjerker", titled Câinele din Văcărești ("The Dog in Văcărești", 1875). These were later complemented by other travel works, which critic Mihai Zamfir likens to the verbal experiments of Impressionist literature, pioneering in the Romanian prose poetry genre. The short comedy Gemenii was his debut work for the stage, but, according to Vianu, failed to show any merit other than a "logical construction" and a preview into Macedonski's use of sarcasm. These writings were followed in 1876 by a concise biography of Cârjaliul, an early 19th-century hajduk. In line with his first Levant-themed poems, Macedonski authored the 1877 story Așa se fac banii ("This Is How Money Is Made", later retold in French as Comment on devient riche et puissant, "How to Become Rich and Powerful"), a fable of fatalism and the Muslim world—it dealt with two brothers, one hard-working and one indolent, the latter of whom earns his money through a series of serendipitous events. Likewise, his verse comedy Iadeș! borrowed its theme from the widely circulated collection of Persian literature known as Sindipa. The setting was however modern, and, as noted by French-born critic Frédéric Damé, the plot also borrowed much from Émile Augier's Gabrielle and from other morality plays of the period. Part of the text was an ironic treatment of youth in liberal professions, an attitude which Macedonski fitted in his emerging anti-bourgeois discourse.

With the first poems in his Nights cycle, Macedonski still showed his allegiance to Romanticism, and in particular to Alphonse de Lamartine, and the supposed inventor of this theme, Alfred de Musset. Noaptea de noiembrie opens with a violent condemnation of his adversaries, and sees Macedonski depicting his own funeral. The poem is commended by Călinescu, who notes that, in contrast to the "apparently trivial beginning", the main part, where Macedonski depicts himself in flight over the Danube, brings the Romanian writer close to the accomplishments of Dante Aligheri. The writer himself claimed that the piece evidenced "the uttermost breath of inspiration I have ever felt in my life." Another poem, Noaptea de aprilie ("April Night"), was probably his testimony of unrequited love for Aristizza Romanescu.

=== Realism and Naturalism ===
By the 1880s, Macedonski developed and applied his "social poetry" theory, as branch of Realism. Explained by the writer himself as a reaction against the legacy of Lamartine, it also signified his brief affiliation with the Naturalist current, a radical segment of the Realist movement. Traian Demetrescu thus noted that Macedonski cherished the works of French Naturalists and Realists such as Gustave Flaubert and Émile Zola. During this phase, Macedonski made known his sympathy for the disinherited, from girls forced into prostitution to convicts sentenced to penal labor on salt mines, and also spoke out against the conventionalism of civil marriages. His Ocnele ("The Salt Mines") includes the verdict:

Vai! Ce-am convenit cu toții a numi soțietate
Mult mai demnă ca tâlharii e de-acest cumplit locaș!
Statul e o ficțiune, iar dreptatea—strâmbătate,
Care duce omenirea dintr-un hop într-un făgaș.

Translation:

Alas! What we have all agreed to deem society
Is far more suited than bandits are for this terrible dwelling!
State is fiction, and justice—an injustice
That leads humanity from a bump down into a rut.

Naturalist depiction was also the main element in his prose pieces of the early 1880s. Among them was the first of several sketch stories using still life techniques, Casa cu nr. 10 (according to Zamfir, a prime sample of Macedonski's "ornamental" genre). With Între cotețe, Dramă banală and later Cometa lui Odorescu ("Odorescu's Comet"), Macedonski speaks about his own biography. The former has for a protagonist Pandele Vergea, a thirty-five-year-old man who is consumed by an avicultural obsession, who dreams of turning into a bird, and who is eventually maimed by his overcrowded fowls. In contrast, Dereanu is a bohemian university student, possessed by dreams of military and political glory, and who meditates about his future in front of Heliade Rădulescu's statue or in Bucharest cafés. Also a bohemian, Odorescu announces his discovery of a comet, before being proved wrong by his aunt, an ordinary woman. Some pieces also double as memoirs: in Dramă banală, the plot revolves around Macedonski's recollection of the 1866 plebiscite. Vianu draws attention to the picturesque depiction of historic Bucharest, a contributing element in Cometa..., Casa cu nr. 10 and Între cotețe.

With Unchiașul Sărăcie (also written in verse), Macedonski took Naturalist tenets into the field of drama. Frédéric Damé believed it an imitation of a play by Ernest d'Hervilly and Alfred Grévin, but, Vianu argues, the Romanian text was only loosely based on theirs: in Macedonski's adaptation, the theme became fairy tale-like, and used a speech style based on Romanian folklore. Around the time of its completion, Macedonski was also working on a similarly loose adaptation of William Shakespeare's Romeo and Juliet, which notably had the two protagonists die in each other's arms. Another such play is 3 decemvrie ("December 3"), which partly retells Friedrich Ludwig Zacharias Werner's Der 24 Februar using Naturalist devices. By contrast, the homage-play Cuza-Vodă is mainly a Romantic piece, where Alexander John Cuza finds his political mission validated by legendary figures in Romanian history.

In parallel, Macedonski was using poetry to carry out his polemics. In an 1884 epigram, he reacted against Alecsandri's Fântâna Blanduziei, but, in Vianu's definition, "his regular causticity seems to be restrained." The piece he had earlier written, presumably against Eminescu, scandalized the public by mocking the rival's mental ruin:

Un X... pretins poet—acum
S-a dus pe cel mai jalnic drum...
L-aș plânge dacă-n balamuc
Destinul său n-ar fi mai bun
Căci până ieri a fost năuc
Și nu e azi decât nebun.

Translation:

An X... who calls himself a poet—has now
Gone down that most pathetic road...
I'd cry for him if in bedlam
His fate were not one for the best
As up to yesterday he had been dopey
And now he is merely insane.

According to Tudor Vianu, Macedonski was mostly motivated by his disappointment in Junimea, and in particular by Eminescu's response to his public persona. Vianu contends that, although Macedonski "never was familiar with the resigned and patient attitudes", he was "by no means an evil man." On one occasion, the poet defended himself against criticism, noting that the epigram had not been specifically addressed to Eminescu, but had been labeled as such by the press, and claiming to have authored it years before its Literatorul edition. However, the later piece Viața de apoi ("The Afterlife") still displays resentments he harbored toward Eminescu.

By 1880–1884, particularly after the Eminescu scandal, Macedonski envisaged prioritizing French as his language of expression. According to Vianu, Macedonski had traversed "the lowest point" of his existence, and had been subject to "one of the most delicate mysteries of poetic creation." Among his pieces of the period is the French-language sonnet Pârle, il me dit alors ("Speak, He Then Said to Me"), where, Vianu notes, "one discovers the state of mind of a poet who decides to expatriate himself."

=== Adoption of Symbolism ===
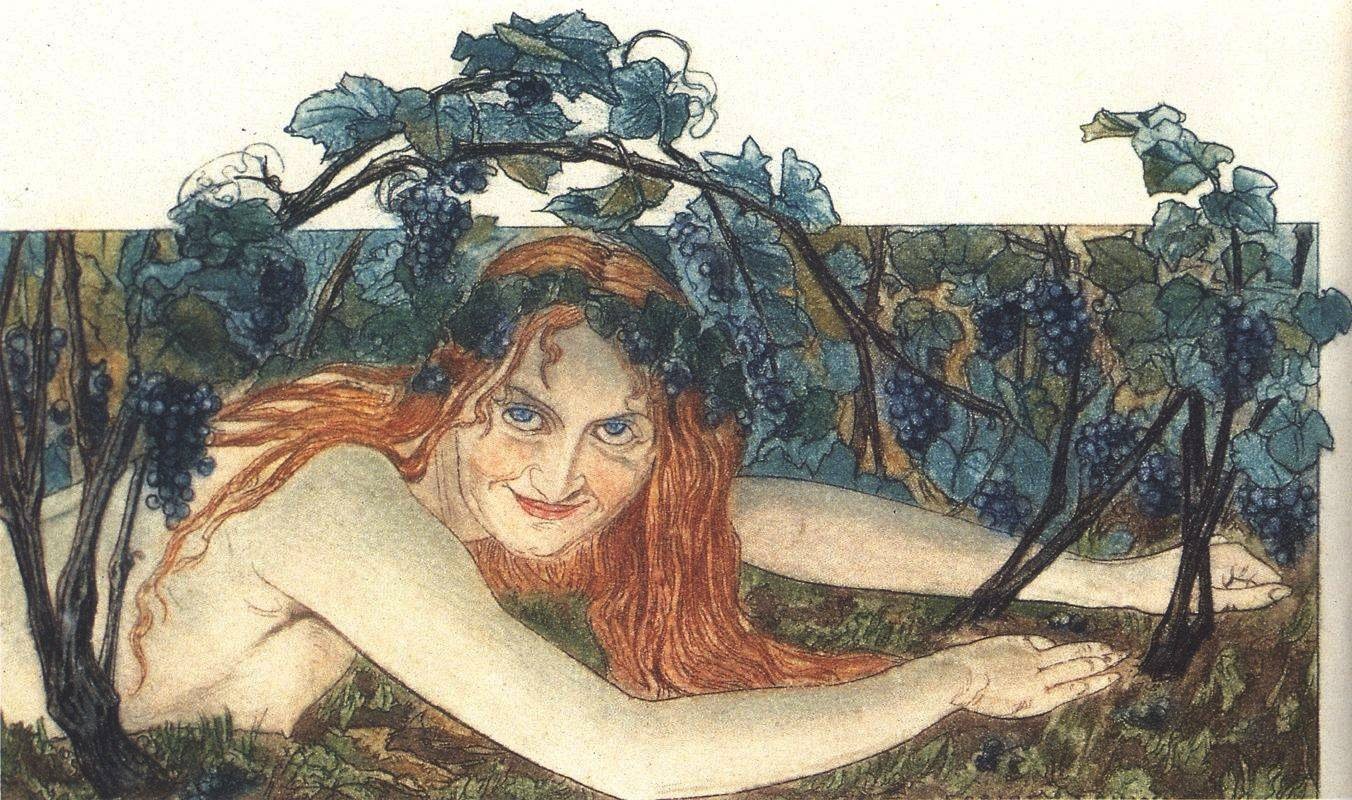
Carlos Schwabe's Âme du vin ("Soul of the Wine"), illustration for Charles Baudelaire's Les Fleurs du mal

According to Mihai Zamfir, at the end of his transition from the "mimetic and egocentric" verse to Symbolist poetry, Macedonski emerged a "remarkable, often extraordinary" author. In the early 20th century, fellow poet and critic N. Davidescu described Macedonski, Ion Minulescu and other Symbolists from Wallachia as distinct from their Moldavian counterparts in both style and themes. Endorsing the theory and practice of Symbolism for much of his life, Macedonski retrospectively claimed to have been one of its first exponents. His version of Symbolism, critic Paul Cernat notes, clashed with that advocated by many of his contemporaries in that it rejected merit to the Decadent movement, and represented the "decorative" aestheticist trend of Paranassian spirit within the Romanian Symbolist current.

Within Poezia viitorului, Macedonski invoked as his models to follow some important or secondary Symbolist and Parnassian figures: Charles Baudelaire, Joséphin Péladan, Maurice Maeterlinck, Stéphane Mallarmé and Jean Moréas. In his review of Bronzes for Mercure de France, Pierre Quillard remarked the "irreproachable" technique, but criticized the poet for being too indebted to both Baudelaire and Leconte de Lisle; other Symbolist figures whom Macedonski is known to have borrowed from are José María de Heredia and Iwan Gilkin. While undergoing this transition, to what linguist Manuela-Delia Suciu argues is a mostly Parnassian phase, Macedonski was still referencing Naturalism, and considered it compatible with Symbolism.

With the adoption of such tenets came a succession of Symbolist poems, where the focus is on minutely-observed objects, usually items of luxury, partly reflecting themes he had explored in the Naturalist stage. Commenting on them, Tudor Vianu argues that no such works had ever been produced in Romanian literature up until that moment. In his Ospățul lui Pentaur ("The Feast of Pentaur"), the poet reflected on civilization itself, as reflected in inanimate opulence. The motif was also developed in descriptive prose fragments later grouped in Cartea de aur, collectively titled nuvele fără oameni ("novellas without people") and compared by Călinescu with the paintings of Theodor Aman.

Also during that stage, Macedonski was exploring the numerous links between Symbolism, mysticism and esotericism. Earlier pieces had already come to explore macabre themes characteristic for an early branch of Symbolism. Influenced by Maurice Rollinat, they include the somber Vaporul morții ("The Ship of Death") and Visul fatal ("The Fatal Dream"). Likewise, the piece titled Imnul lui Satan ("Satan's Hymn") was placed by critics in connection with Les Litanies de Satan (part of Baudelaire's Les Fleurs du mal), but, Vianu argues, the source of Macedonski's satanic themes may have been lodged in his own vision of the world. This interest also reflected in his 1893 Saul, where Cincinat Pavelescu's contribution is supposedly minimal. Echoing satanic themes, Ernest Legouvé's dramatic version of the Medea myth (which Macedonski translated at some point in his life) and the classical work of Jean Racine, it shows the dark powers of political conflict intervening between the eponymous king and his ephebos-like protégé David, the latter of whom turns out to be the agent of spiritual revolution.

Noaptea de august ("August Night"), outlines a monistic belief probably inspired by Rosicrucianism, stressing the unity between soul and matter and depicting Macedonski's own journey into a transcendental space. Following the examples of Baudelaire's Les paradis artificiels, but also echoing his readings from Paul Verlaine and Théophile Gautier, Macedonski left poems dealing with narcotics and substance abuse, at least some of which reflected his personal experience with nicotine and possibly other unnamed drugs. Also at that stage, Macedonski also began publishing the "instrumentalist" series of his Symbolist poems. This form of experimental poem was influenced by the theories of René Ghil and verified through his encounter with Remy de Gourmont's views. In parallel, it reaffirmed Macedonski's personal view that music and the spoken word were intimately related (a perspective notably attested by his 1906 interview with Jules Combarieu). Romanian critic Petre Răileanu theorized that such elements evidenced Macedonski's transition to "metaliterature". On a different level, they echoed an older influence, that of Gottfried August Bürger.

=== Excelsior ===
Despite having stated his interest in innovation, Macedonski generally displayed a more conventional style in his Excelsior volume. It included Noaptea de mai, which Vianu sees as "one of the [vernacular's] most beautiful poems" and as evidence of "a clear joy, without any torment whatsoever". A celebration of spring partly evoking folkloric themes, it was made famous by the recurring refrain, Veniți: privighetoarea cântă și liliacul e-nflorit ("Come along: the nightingale is singing and the lilac is in blossom"). Like Noaptea de mai, Lewki (named after and dedicated to the Snake Island), depicts intense joy, completed in this case by what Vianu calls "the restorative touch of nature." The series also returned to Levant settings and Islamic imagery, particularly in Acșam dovalar (named after the Turkish version of Witr). Also noted within the volume is his short "Modern Psalms" series, including the piece Iertare ("Forgiveness"), which is addressed to God:

Iertare! Sunt ca orice om
M-am îndoit de-a ta putere,
Am râs de sfintele mistere
Ce sunt în fiecare-atom...
Iertare! Sunt ca orice om.

Translation:

Forgiveness! I'm like any man
I have been doubting your power
I derided the sacred mysteries
That lie within each of the atoms...
Forgiveness! I'm like any man.

Excelsior also included Noaptea de ianuarie ("January Night"), which encapsulates one of his best-known political statements. Anghelescu reads it as a "meditation on disillusionment that culminates in a vitality-laden exhortation of action." Its anti-bourgeois attitude, literary historian Z. Ornea argues, was one of the meeting points between Macedonski and Junimism. In what is seen as its most acid section, the text notably reads:

M-am născut în niște zile când tâmpita burghezime
Din tejghea făcând tribună, legiune de coțcari,
Pune-o talpă noroioasă pe popor și boierime,
Zile când se-mparte țara în călăi și în victime
Și când steagul libertății e purtat de cârciumari.

Translation:

I was born into days when the moronic bourgeoisie
Turning counters into rostrums, a legion of knaves,
Places a muddy sole on the people and the boyars,
Days when the country is divided into hangmen and victims
And when the flag of liberty is carried by publicans.

At the same time as being engaged in his most violent polemics, Macedonski produced meditative and serene poems, which were later judged to be among his best. Noaptea de decemvrie is the synthesis of his main themes and influences, rated by commentators as his "masterpiece". Partly based on an earlier poem (Meka, named after the Arab city), it tells the story of an emir, who, left unsatisfied by the shallow and opulent life he leads in Baghdad, decides to leave on pilgrimage. While critics agree that it is to be read as an allegory of Macedonski's biography, the ironic text does not make it clear whether the emir actually reaches his target, nor if the central metaphor of Mecca as a mirage means that the goal is not worth sacrificing for. While Mircea Anghelescu comments that Macedonski illustrates "unusual tension" by rigorously amplifying references to the color red, seen as a symbol of suffering, Călinescu notes that the sequence of lyrics has a studied "delirious" element, and illustrates this with the quote:

Și el e emirul, și toate le are...
E tânăr, e farmec, e trăsnet, e zeu,
Dar zilnic se simte furat de-o visare...
Spre Meka se duce cu gândul mereu,
Și-n fața dorinței—ce este—dispare
Iar el e emirul, și toate le are.

Translation:

And he is the emir, and he owns each thing...
He's young, he's a charm, he's a bolt, he's a god,
But in each day he feels he is swept by a dream...
Towards Mecca his thought races constantly,
And faced with the wish, all things disappear,
And he is the emir, and he owns each thing.

=== Late prose works ===
In prose, his focus shifted back to the purely descriptive, or led Alexandru Macedonski into the realm of fantasy literature. These stories, most of which were eventually collected in Cartea de aur, include memoirs of his childhood in the Amaradia region, nostalgic portrayals of the Oltenian boyar environment, idealized depictions of Cuza's reign, as well as a retrospective view on the end of Rom slavery (found in his piece Verigă țiganul, "Verigă the Gypsy"). The best known among them is Pe drum de poștă, a third-person narrative and thinly disguised memoir, where the characters are an adolescent Alexandru Macedonski and his father, General Macedonski. The idyllic outlook present in such stories is one of the common meeting points between his version of Symbolism and traditionalist authors such as Barbu Ștefănescu Delavrancea. Vianu indicates the connection, but adds: "Macedonski descended, through memory, in the world of the village, with the tremor of regret for the peace and plenty of the old settlements, so well polished that each person, landowner as well as peasant, lived within a framework that nature itself seemed to have granted. [...] in depicting rural environments, Macedonski presents the point of view of a conservative."

Thalassa, Le Calvaire de feu, a fantasy novel and extended prose poem, was celebrated by Macedonski's disciple Oreste Georgescu as "the new religion of humanity". The volume carried the mocking dedication "To France, this Chaldea" (thought by Vianu to reference Péladan's views on the decay of civilization). It has affinities with writings by the Italian Decadent author Gabriele d'Annunzio, as well as echoes from Anatole France. The hero Thalassa, a Greek boy, works as a lighthouse-keeper on Snake Island, fantasizing about the golden age of mankind. His fate is changed by a shipwreck, during which a girl, Caliope, reaches the island's shore. Thalassa and Caliope fall in love, but are mysteriously unable to seal their union through sexual intercourse: the boy attributes this failure to the "curse" of human individuality. Seeking to achieve a perfect union with his lover, he eventually kills her and drowns himself in the Black Sea.

In her review for Mercure de France, novelist Rachilde argued: "Very difficult to read, entirely developed in Symbolist manner [and] almost impossible to recount, obviously written in French but nevertheless obviously conceived by a Romanian (and what a spirited Romanian!)." Rachilde believed the work to display "the fragrance of Oriental spices [...] rose marmalade and a slice of bear meat." According to Vianu, the book builds on Macedonski's earlier themes, replacing Naturalist observation with a metaphysical speculation about idealism. One other aspect of Macedonski's stylistic exploration took him to attempt recording synesthesia. His manuscript is written in ink of several colors, which, he believed, was to help readers get a full sense of its meaning. Like other synesthetic aspects of his novel, this is believed to have been inspired by the techniques of Baudelaire and Arthur Rimbaud.

Thalassa, Le Calvaire de feu is noted for its numerous cultural references, and especially for using a wide range of metaphors. Such aspects have been reviewed negatively by modern critics. Tudor Vianu writes: "the poet makes such waste of gemstones that we feel like saying some of them must be false", while Călinescu, who notes that some fragments reveal "an incomparable artist" and "a professional metaphorist", notes that "in the end, such virtuosities become a bore." According to Manuela-Delia Suciu, Thalassa is "prolix" and "too polished", traits believed by Zamfir to be less irritating in the Romanian version. Critic Cornel Moraru found that, in the background, Thalassa, a "great Symbolist novel", confronts Ancient Greek and Christian mythology, but "abuses" the religious vocabulary. Another part of the novel's imagery is erotic, and includes an elaborate and aestheticized description of male genitalia.

The four-act tragicomedy Le Fou? is seen by Vianu as comparable in subject matter and depth to Enrico IV, a celebrated 1922 play by Luigi Pirandello. The plot reflects Macedonski's confrontation with his critics, and his acceptance of the fact that people saw in him an eccentric. The central figure is a banker, Dorval, who identifies himself with Napoleon Bonaparte to the point where he sees episodes in his biography as mirrors of early 19th-century battles. Unlike patients with dissociative identity disorder, Dorval does not actually imagine his life has become Napoleon's, but rather joins with him on an intellectual level. Witnesses of this disorder are divided into family, who seek to have Dorval committed, and close friends, who come to see his take on life as a manifestation of genius. The spectator is led to believe that the latter interpretation is the correct one. At a larger level, Vianu indicates, the play is also Macedonski's critique of capitalism, and, using Parisian argot, makes allusive references to famous people of the day.

Particularly during the 1890s, Macedonski was a follower of Edgar Allan Poe and of Gothic fiction in general, producing a Romanian version of Poe's Metzengerstein story, urging his own disciples to translate other such pieces, and adopting "Gothic" themes in his original prose. Indebted to Jules Verne and H. G. Wells, Macedonski also wrote a number of science fiction stories, including the 1913 Oceania-Pacific-Dreadnought, which depicts civilization on the verge of a crisis. The gigantic commercial ship is maintained by a banker's union, and designed to grant travelers access to every pleasure imaginable; this causes the working-class inhabited cities on the continent to fall into a state of neglect and permanent violence, the climax of the story occurring with the bankers' decision to destroy their creation. Oceania-Pacific-Dreadnought is noted for anticipating television, the ship being equipped with electrically operated "large and clear mirrors" that display "images from various parts of the Earth". Macedonski was by then interested in the development of cinema, and authored a silent film screenplay based on Comment on devient riche et puissant.

=== Final transition ===
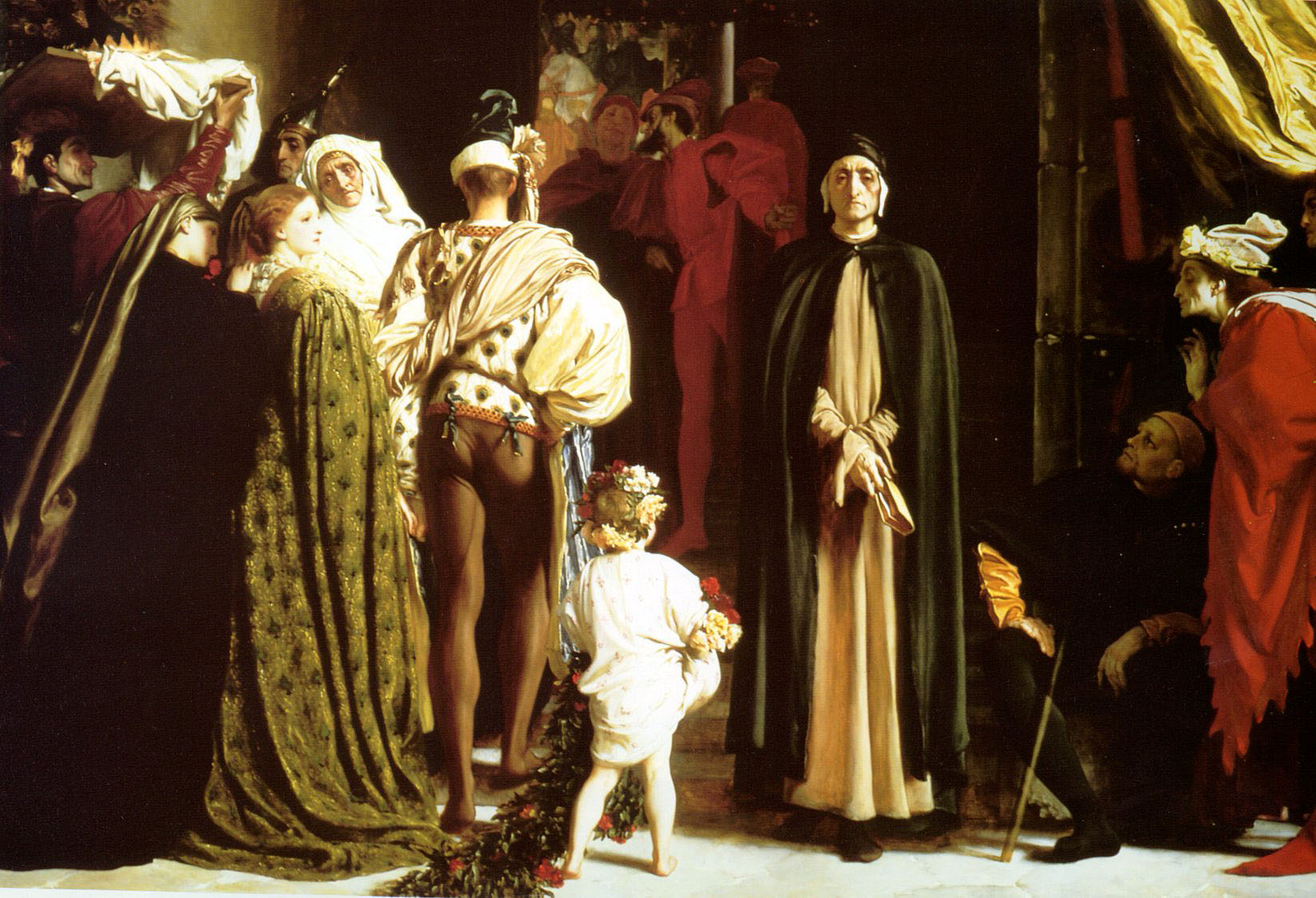
Dante in Exile, 1864 painting by Lord Leighton

Late in his life, Macedonski had come to reject Symbolist tenets, defining them as "imbecilities" designed for "the uncultured". Ultima verba, the very last poems to be written by him, show him coming to terms with himself, and are treasured for their serene or intensely joyous vision of life and human accomplishment. The rondels written at this stage, known collectively as Poema rondelurilor, are one of the first instances where the technique is used locally. Like those written previously by Literatorul's Pavelescu and Alexandru Obedenaru, they are based on an earlier motif present in Macedonski's work, that of recurring refrains. Many of the pieces document the poet's final discoveries. One of them is Rondelul crinilor ("The Rondel of the Lilies"), which proclaims fragrances as the source of beatitude: În crini e beția cea rară, "In lilies one finds that exceptional drunkenness". According to Ștefan Cazimir, Rondelul orașului mic ("The Rondel of the Small Town") shows a "likable wave of irony and self-irony", and the poet himself coming to terms with "the existence of a world who ignores him." Proof of his combativeness was still to be found in Rondelul contimporanilor ("The Rondel of the Contemporaries").

The poet's take on life is also outlined in his final play, Moartea lui Dante. Călinescu writes that, by then, Macedonski was "obsessed" with the Divine Comedy. Macedonski identifies with his hero, Dante Aligheri, and formulates his own poetic testament while identifying World War I Romania with the medieval Republic of Florence. Tudor Vianu remarks: "In Dante's great self-pride, Macedonski found his own." He sees the play as the best such work to have been produced by Macedonski, whereas Călinescu deems it "puerile". Zamfir believes Moartea... to be a significant text in Macedonski's bibliography, "one of the first samples of Romanian Symbolist theater", and as such indebted mainly to Maeterlinck. Vianu argues that the play may document the Romanian writer's late rejection of France, through the protagonist's statement: "the French are a gentle people, but their soul is different from mine."

A number of rondels show Macedonski's late fascination with the Far East, China and Japan. George Călinescu believes that this is to be understood as one item in a large antithesis, the other being Decadent Paris, which one rondel describes as "hell". The Orient, viewed as the space of serenity, is believed by Macedonski to be peopled by toy-like women and absent opium-smokers, and to be kept orderly by a stable meritocracy. The Chinese-themed poem Tsing-Ly-Tsi, which Cazimir notes for its discreet, "almost imperceptible", humor, reads:

Tsing-Ly-Tsi stă-n prispa de-aur,
Cu ochi mici ca de ghierlan,
Sub de-argint frunzos tezaur,
Casa e de porțelan.

Translation:

Tsing-Ly-Tsi sits on the golden porch,
With his eyes as small as those of mice,
Under the silvery, leafy, treasure,
His house is porcelain-like.

== Legacy ==
=== Macedonski's school and its early impact ===
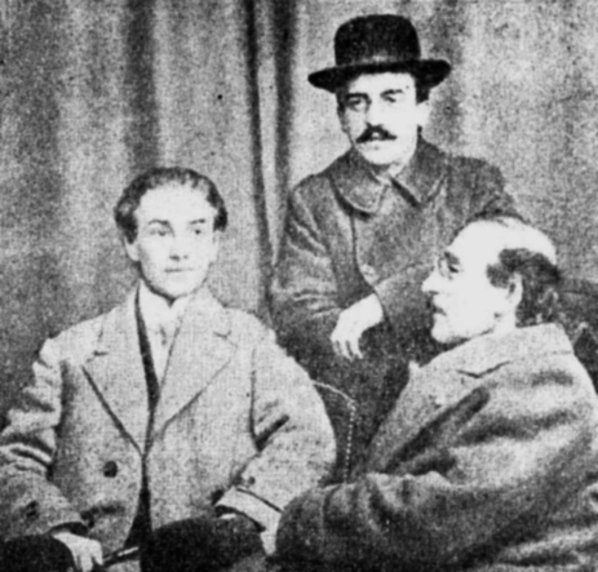
Alexandru Macedonski (seated, to the right) facing Oreste Georgescu. Alexis Macedonski standing

Alexandru Macedonski repeatedly expressed the thought that, unlike his contemporaries, posterity would judge him a great poet. With the exception of Mihail Dragomirescu, conservative literary critics tended to ignore Macedonski while he was alive. The first such figure was Junimea's Titu Maiorescu, who believed him to be a minor author, referring to him only a couple of times in his books and usually ridiculing him in his articles. One of these texts, the 1886 essay Poeți și critici ("Poets and Critics"), spoke of Macedonski as having "vitiated" poetry, a notion he also applied to Constantin D. Aricescu and Aron Densușianu. Especially radical pronouncements were left by the traditionalist authors Ilarie Chendi and Nicolae Iorga. Chendi wrote of Macedonski being "the caricature of a man", having "a feverish mind" and being motivated by "the brutal instinct of revenge". Iorga, who became better known as a historian, later retracted some of the statements he had made against the poet during the 1890s. Among the younger prominent traditionalist writers was the Transylvanian-born Lucian Blaga, who may have purposefully avoided Macedonski during his first visit to Bucharest in 1920. Although more sympathetic to the Symbolist author, both Dragomirescu and Gheorghe Adamescu tended to describe him as exclusively the product of French and Decadent literature, while Dragomirescu's disciple Ion Trivale denied all merit to Macedonski's literature.

According to Tudor Vianu, Macedonski's intellectual friends (among them Anghel Demetriescu, George Ionescu-Gion, Bonifaciu Florescu, Grigore Tocilescu and V. A. Urechia) were largely responsible for passing down "a better and truer image of the abused poet." It was also due to Dragomirescu that Noaptea de decemvrie was included in a literature textbook for final grade high school students, which some argue is the poet's first-ever presence in the Romanian curriculum. According to historian Lucian Nastasă, the poet's wife Ana Rallet behaved like an "excellent secretary" while Macedonski was still alive, and thereafter helped sort and edit his manuscript while maintaining "an actual cult" for her husband.

Macedonski's cosmopolitan circle was the center of a literary alternative to the prevailing conservatism and Eminescu-like traditionalism of the day, the latter tendency being grouped around Sămănătorul magazine for part of Macedonski's lifetime. While Macedonski himself maintained his links with Romanticism and Classicism, commentators have retrospectively recognized in him the main person who announced Romania's first wave in modernist literature. Many first-generation disciples were to part with his guidelines early on, either by radicalizing their Symbolism or by stepping out of its confines. Traian Demetrescu was one of the first to do so, focusing on his commitment to socialism—Vianu notes that the split took place "without coldness and the heart's versatility" on Macedonski's part. Literary researcher Lidia Bote argues that it was Petică who first illustrated mature Symbolism, emancipating himself from Macedonski's eclectic tendencies after 1902. By that time, the Symbolist authors Dimitrie Anghel and N. D. Cocea used Macedonski's fantasy prose as an inspiration for their own, and N. Davidescu was borrowing from his mystical discourse. The pictorial and joyous elements in Macedonski's poems were also serving to inspire Stamatiad, Eugeniu Ștefănescu-Est and Horia Furtună. In the early stages of his career, Ion Pillat wrote pieces which echo his master's choice of exotic themes. A more discreet legacy of Macedonski's ideas was also preserved inside the conservative and traditionalist camps. Although his separation from Literatorul was drastic, and led him to rally with Junimea, Duiliu Zamfirescu built on some elements borrowed from the magazine's ideology, incorporating them into his literary vision.

Many of Macedonski's most devoted disciples, whom he himself had encouraged, have been rated by various critics as secondary or mediocre. This is the case of Theodor Cornel (who made his name as an art critic), Mircea Demetriade, Oreste Georgescu, Alexandru Obedenaru, Stoenescu, Stamatiad, Carol Scrob, Dumitru Karnabatt and Donar Munteanu. Another such minor author was the self-styled "hermeticist" Alexandru Petroff, who expanded on Macedonski's ideas about esoteric knowledge.

Macedonski's eldest son Alexis continued to pursue a career as a painter. His son Soare followed in his footsteps, receiving acclaim from art critics of the period. Soare's short career ended in 1928, before he turned nineteen, but his works have been featured in several retrospective exhibitions, including one organized by Alexis. Alexis later experimented with scenic design as an assistant to French filmmaker René Clair; his later life, shrouded in mystery and intrigue, led him to a career in Fascist Italy and Francoist Spain. Another of Alexandru Macedonski's sons, Nikita, was also a poet and painter. For a while in the 1920s, he edited the literary supplement of Universul newspaper. Two years after her father's death, Anna Macedonski married poet Mihail Celarianu.

In addition to his polemical portrayals in works by Alecsandri, Eminescu and Caragiale, Macedonski's career was an inspiration for various authors. His image acquired mythical proportions for his followers. Like Demetrescu, many of them left memoirs on Macedonski which were published before or after his death. His admirers were writing poetry about him as early as 1874, and, in 1892, Cincinat Pavelescu published a rhapsodizing portrait of Macedonski as "the Artist". Pavelescu, Dragoslav and Petică paid homage to the writer by leaving recollections which describe him as a devoted and considerate friend. In contrast, traditionalist poet Alexandru Vlahuță authored an 1889 sketch story in which Macedonski (referred to as Polidor) is the object of derision.

=== Late recognition ===
Actual recognition of the poet as a classic came only in the interwar period. A final volume of never before published poems, Poema rondelurilor, saw print in 1927. Macedonski's work was analyzed and popularized by a new generation of critics, among them Vianu and George Călinescu. The post-Junimist modernist critic Eugen Lovinescu also commented favorably on Macedonski's work, but overall, Călinescu asserts, his opinions on the subject gave little insight into what he actually thought about the poet. He also recounts that Macedonski himself treated Lovinescu with disdain, and once called him "a canary".

The emerging avant-garde, although originating from Symbolism, progressively took its distance from Literatorul's legacy. Initially, Macedonski's contribution to experimental literature was continued within formal Symbolism by his disciples Demetriade, Iuliu Cezar Săvescu and Ion Minulescu. The latter was particularly indebted to Macedonski in matters of vision and language. In 1904, Tudor Arghezi also left behind the Literatorul circle and its tenets, eventually arriving to the fusion of modernist, traditionalist and avant-garde elements. However, he remained indebted to Macedonski's example in his descriptive prose. The 1912 Simbolul magazine, which moved between conventional Symbolism and the emerging avant-garde, also published an Imagist-inspired parody of Noaptea de mai, signed by Adrian Maniu. A co-founder of Dadaism during the late 1910s, Tristan Tzara is believed by Swedish researcher Tom Sandqvist to have been inspired more or less directly by Macedonski, and in particular by the latter's thoughts on the relation between absurdity and poetry. In his debut poems, Benjamin Fondane-Barbu Fundoianu occasionally followed Macedonski, but, by 1920, stated that the Symbolist doyen merely imitated French models to the point of "parasitism".

Several avant-garde authors returned to Macedonski's literary guidelines by the late 1920s, as they themselves grew more moderate. This was the case of Maniu and Ion Vinea, both of whom published prose works in the line of Thalassa. The same work is also believed to have influenced two non-avant-garde authors, Davidescu and Mateiu Caragiale, who remained close to the tenets Symbolism. Mateiu was the illegitimate son of Ion Luca Caragiale, but, Vianu notes, could withstand comparisons with his father's rival: the eccentricities were complementary, although Mateiu Caragiale shied away from public affairs. In the same post-Symbolist generation, Celarianu (Macedonski's posthumous son-in-law), George Bacovia and Păstorel Teodoreanu also built on Macedonski's legacy, being later joined in this by the Bessarabian linguist Eugenio Coșeriu (who, in his early poetic career, imitated Macedonski's rondel style). In the late 1920s, when their form of modern psalms inspired Albanian-Romanian poet Aleksander Stavre Drenova, Macedonski and Arghezi both made an indirect impact on Albanian literature.

Macedonski's status as one of Romanian literature's greats was consolidated later in the 20th century. By this time, Noaptea de decemvrie had become one of the most recognizable literary works to be taught in Romanian schools. During the first years of Communist Romania, the Socialist Realist current condemned Symbolism (see Censorship in Communist Romania), but spoke favorably of Macedonski's critique of the bourgeoisie. A while after this episode, Marin Sorescu, one of the best-known modernist poets of his generation, wrote a homage-parody of the Nights cycle. Included in the volume Singur între poeți ("Alone among Poets"), it is seen by critic Mircea Scarlat as Sorescu's most representative such pieces. Also then, Noaptea de decemvrie partly inspired Ștefan Augustin Doinaș' ballad Mistrețul cu colți de argint.

In the 1990s, Ștefan Agopian took the Nights cycle as inspiration for an erotic short story, while Pavel Șușară adapted his rondels to a modernized setting. Macedonski's prose also influenced younger writers such as Angelo Mitchievici and Anca Maria Mosora. In neighboring Moldova, Macedonski influenced the Neosymbolism of Aureliu Busuioc. A magazine by the name of Literatorul, which claims to represent the legacy of Macedonski's publication, was founded in Romania in 1991, being edited by writers Sorescu, Fănuș Neagu and Mircea Micu. In 2006, the Romanian Academy granted posthumous membership to Alexandru Macedonski.

Macedonski's poems had a sizable impact on Romania's popular culture. During communism, Noaptea de mai was the basis for a successful musical adaptation, composed by Marian Nistor and sung by Mirabela Dauer. Tudor Gheorghe, a singer-songwriter inspired by American folk revival, also used some of Macedonski's texts as lyrics to his melodies. In the 2000s, the refrain of Noaptea de mai was mixed into a manea parody by Adrian Copilul Minune.

=== Portrayals, visual tributes and landmarks ===
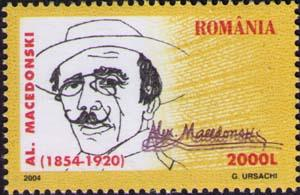
Macedonski's portrait on a Romanian postage stamp (2004)

Although his poetic theories were largely without echoes in Romanian art, Macedonski captured the interest of several modern artists, including, early on, cartoonist Nicolae Petrescu Găină. Alongside other writers who visited Terasa Oteteleșanu, Macedonski was notably portrayed the drawings of celebrated Romanian artist Iosif Iser. He is also depicted in a 1918 lithograph by Jean Alexandru Steriadi, purportedly Steriadi's only Symbolist work. Thalassa, Le Calvaire de feu inspired a series of reliefs, designed by Alexis Macedonski and hosted in his father's house in Dorobanți. During the 1910s, busts of him were completed by two sculptors, Alexandru Severin and Friedrich Storck, one of Storck's variants being hosted by the Ioan Cantacuzino collection. In 1919, Theodor Burcă was also inspired to complete another bust, and, during World War II, was commissioned by Mayor of Bucharest Ioan Rășcanu to build a Macedonski Monument in the Grădina Icoanei park, but this was never completed. Constantin Piliuță, a painter active in the second half of the 20th century, made Macedonski the subject of a portrait in series dedicated to Romanian cultural figures (also depicted were Nicolae Iorga, Ștefan Luchian and Vianu). In 1975, a bust of Macedonski, the work of Constantin Foamete, was unveiled in Craiova.

Of Macedonski's numerous residences, the one in Dorobanți was demolished when the Academy of Economic Studies (ASE) was expanded. A commemorative plaque was later put up near the spot. Macedonski's childhood home in Goiești passed into state property under communism, and was in turn a school, a community home and a Macedonski Museum, before falling into neglect after the Romanian Revolution of 1989. Several streets named in honor of Alexandru Macedonski, notably in Bucharest (by the ASE), Craiova, Cluj-Napoca and Timișoara.

== Works published anthumously ==
- Prima verba (poetry, 1872)
- Ithalo (poem, 1878)
- Poezii (poetry, 1881/1882)
- Parizina (translation of Parisina, 1882)
- Iadeș! (comedy, 1882)
- Dramă banală (short story, 1887)
- Saul (with Cincinat Pavelescu; tragedy, 1893)
- Excelsior (poetry, 1895)
- Bronzes (poetry, 1897)
- Falimentul clerului ortodox (essay, 1898)
- Cartea de aur (prose, 1902)
- Thalassa, Le Calvaire de feu (novel, 1906; 1914)
- Flori sacre (poetry, 1912)
- Zaherlina (essay, 1920)
