= Rondel =

Rondel (from Old French, the diminutive of roont "round", meaning "small circle") may refer to:

- Rondel (dagger) or roundel, type of medieval dagger
- Rondel (armour), a circular piece of steel, as part of an armour harness, that normally protects a vulnerable point
- Rondel (gaming), a wheel-shaped game mechanism with a number of different options.
- Rondel (poem), short poem of 14 lines
- Rondel enclosure, type of prehistoric enclosure found in continental Europe
- Rondel Racing, a British racing team that competed in the Formula 2 series between 1971 and 1973
- Rondel, a song by the English composer Edward Elgar
- The Rondels, an American instrumental group consisting of Ray Pizzi, James Petze, Lennie Petze, and Lenny Collins
- Bill Deal and the Rhondels, a band formed in 1959 in Portsmouth, Virginia, crossing blue-eyed soul and beach music.

== See also ==
- Roundel, a distinctive round logo on military (air force or navy) craft
- Roundel (poem), a poetic form devised by A. C. Swinburne
- Rondeau (disambiguation)
- Rondell (disambiguation)
- Rondelle (disambiguation)
- Roundel (disambiguation)
