= Mircea Demetriade =

Romanian poet, playwright and actor (1861 - 1914)

Mircea Demetriade (Demetriad)
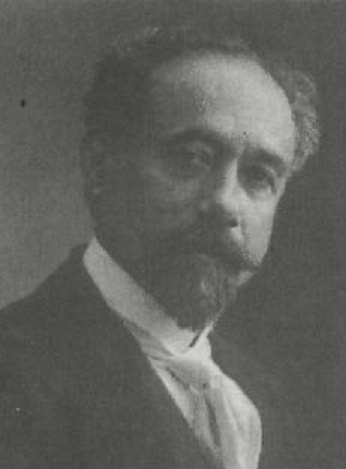
- Born: September 2, 1861
- Died: September 11, 1914 (aged 53)
- Occupations: poet, dramatist, journalist, literary critic, stage actor
- Writing career
- Pen name: M. C. Dimitriade, Mircea des Métriades, Ali-Baba, Demir, Dimir, D. Mir
- Period: 1880–1914
- Genres: lyric poetry, sonnet, fable, comedy, fantasy, history play, verse drama, vers libre, essay
- Literary movement: Symbolism (Romanian); Parnassianism

Mircea Constantin Demetriade (Romanian pronunciation: [ˈmirtʃe̯a konstanˈtin demetriˈade]; also rendered as Demetriad, Dimitriade, Dimitriadi, or Demitriadi; September 2, 1861 – September 11, 1914) was a Romanian poet, playwright and actor, one of the earliest animators of the local Symbolist movement. Born in Oltenia to a theatrical family, he largely gave up on a similar career to become a bohemian writer. He associated with, and was inspired by, Alexandru Macedonski, building on early romantic influences at Literatorul magazine. Later, he incorporated borrowings from Charles Baudelaire and Arthur Rimbaud, two of the authors Demetriade would translate into Romanian.

Demetriade's work, which mainly consists of lyric poetry and verse drama with fantasy elements, was often included in the National Theater Bucharest programs; however, critics and historians have dismissed it as a rather minor contribution to Romanian literature. In addition to pioneering Symbolism, Demetriade affiliated with the socialist circle of Constantin Dobrogeanu-Gherea and Constantin Mille, and was a local promoter of Freemasonry. During the 1880s, he cultivated the friendships of writers Vasile Alecsandri and Bonifaciu Florescu, editing Analele Literare, a magazine which mixed Symbolist activism and literary scholarship. He is additionally remembered for helping to found the society of writers at Kübler Coffeehouse circle, and for being one of the regulars at Macedonski's literary salon.

== Biography ==
=== Early life and poetic debut ===
Demetriade was born in Ocnele Mari, Vâlcea County, or, according to other documents, in Craiova (yet another account, probably erroneous, has Bucharest). The family was of Greek origin, its original surname being reported as Dimitriadis, then Romanianized as Demetriade or Demetriad. The poet's father was a Greek immigrant and celebrated actor, Constantin "Costache" Dimitriade. His wife, Mircea's mother, was Luxița (née Saragea), who was descended from the old boyar nobility of Oltenia. Costache's other children, Aristide Demetriade and Aristizza Romanescu, also became actors. Demeteriade was the uncle of Eraclie Sterian, the sexologist and playwright, and the great-uncle of poet-sociologist Paul Sterian.

Mircea left high school early and then took declamation courses at the Bucharest Conservatory. In 1880, he appeared alongside his sister and (on his retiring performance) his father, in a production for the National Theater Bucharest; the chosen play was Victor Séjour's "Outlaw of the Adriatic", and he had the title role. Having registered some success in comedy, with a leading role in Bogdan Petriceicu Hasdeu's Trei crai, he became a pledgee of the National Theater the following year.

Demetriade soon became more interested in writing and composing poetry. Primarily a disciple of the proto-Symbolist Alexandru Macedonski, Demetriade also described himself as a student of the 1840s romantic poet Ion Heliade Rădulescu. According to his colleague and biographer N. Davidescu, Demetriade was also an avid reader of literary theory by Charles Baudelaire, Arthur Rimbaud, and René Ghil, constantly at work refining and modernizing his own art. Davidescu sees Demetriade and most other Romanian Symbolists as in reality Parnassians; this verdict was partly shared by comparatist Adrian Marino. He also reads a "Parnassian note" and echoes from the "macabre poetry" of Maurice Rollinat in the work of Demetriade, Alexandru Obedenaru, and Alexandru Petroff.

Demetriade's first published work consisted of poems that appeared in Macedonski's Literatorul, in 1880; his first book was the 1883 Fabule, followed in 1884 by the collection Versuri. These works fund an early reviewer in the traditionalist Ioan Russu-Șirianu, who saw Demetriade as a promising sonneteer, but rejected his experiments with meter. Demetriade's first work as a translator, from Préville's "thoughts on theater", also saw print in Literatorul. He later followed up with pure-poetry and vers libre renditions from Baudelaire, Rimbaud, Gérard de Nerval and Paul Verlaine.

Demetriade, who sometimes used the pen names M. Demetriad and M. C. Dimitriade, soon became an animator of the literary world. He joined Macedonski's literary circle at Fialcovski Coffeehouse in Bucharest, before moving to Kübler and, later, to Imperial—this became the epicenter of the small but growing Symbolist scene. For much of the 1880s, he was also involved with the socialist movement, first as a writer for Constantin Dobrogeanu-Gherea's Emanciparea. In December 1884, Demetriade was a founding member of the Bucharest Social Studies Circle, with Alexandru G. Radovici and Constantin Mille, wherein he also represented a Masonic Lodge (named after Mircea Rosetti).

With the National Theater troupe, including his sister and Constantin Nottara, Demetriade toured the Romanian-speaking regions of the Duchy of Bukovina, Austria-Hungary, during summer 1885. He gave readings of Romanian poetry and spoke to a cultural gathering in Czernowitz. In 1885–1886, his father having died in an accident on the outskirts of Bucharest, Demetriade gave recitals, from his own lyrical work, at Dacia Theater, Bucharest. In 1891, he made another return to the stage, again alongside Aristizza. Their version of Hamlet, with Demetriade as The Ghost, was notably staged at the Carltheater in Vienna.

=== First plays ===
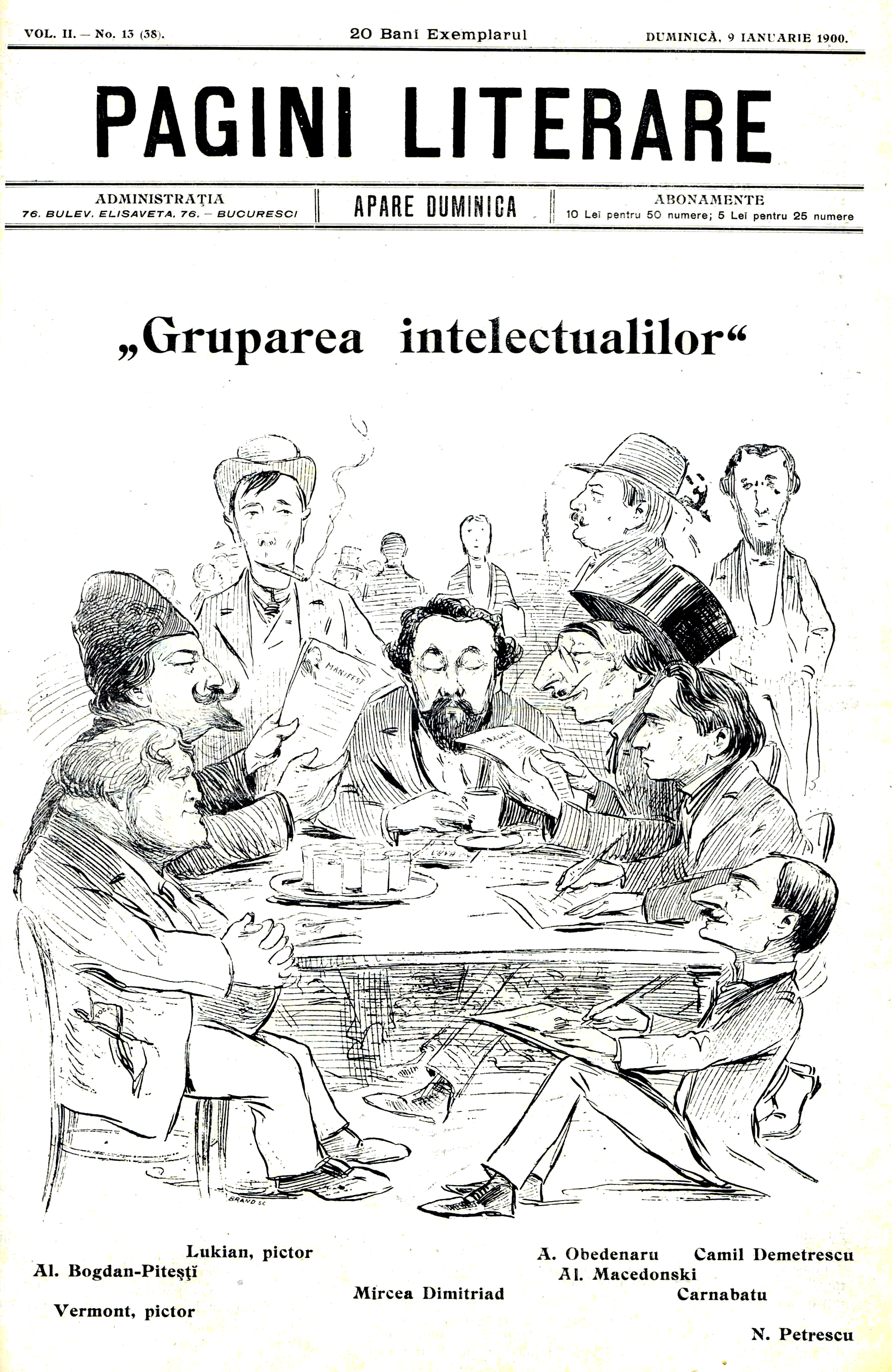
"The Intellectual Group", January 1900 caricature by Nicolae Petrescu Găină. Demetriade (center), between Alexandru Bogdan-Pitești and Alexandru Macedonski; also pictured: Nicolae Vermont, Ștefan Luchian, Alexandru Obedenaru, Dumitru Karnabatt, Camil Demetrescu, and Petrescu-Găină himself

Demetriade also cultivated close friendships with other more writers, including Vasile Alecsandri and Bonifaciu Florescu. He was thus a speaker at Alecsandri's funeral in 1890, and the last person to visit Florescu upon the latter's death in 1899. From 1885 to 1889, with Macedonski absent from Romania, he published his own "Macedonskian" literary review, Analele Literare ("Literary Annals"). The magazine had contributions from Symbolists such as Traian Demetrescu and from Macedonski himself. However, it mainly included academic articles by Florescu, Hasdeu, and other scholars: Anghel Demetriescu, Gheorghe Ghibănescu, Petre Ispirescu, and Lazăr Șăineanu. In its first issues, Analele Literare also hosted Demetriade debut play, În noaptea nunții ("On Their Wedding Night"), called a "weak comedy" by the traditionalist Nicolae Iorga.

In addition to the Literatorul (or Revista Literară), he also published in the various Macedonskian satellite reviews, from Iuliu Cezar Săvescu and Florescu's Dumineca to Petroff's Hermes. Demetriade's other contributions were hosted by various Symbolist or mainstream publications, among them Telegraful Român, Vieața Nouă, Revista Orientală, Unirea, Naționalul, Fântâna Blanduziei, Ileana, Liga Literară, and Generația Nouă. During the elections of 1892, he registered himself as a voter in the 1st College, a resident of Olari, Bucharest.

After În noaptea nunții, which was to be premiered at the National Theater in 1900, Demetriade focused mainly on versified plays which were picturesque and had a fairy-tale ambience: Făt-Frumos ("Prince Charming"), 1889; Renegatul ("The Renegade"), 1893; Opere dramatice ("Works in Drama"), 1905. According to the literary critic George Călinescu, Renegatul was "monotonous and artistically modest", "abundant in the stuff of operetta songs". The work shows a disabused engineer, Mahmud (played by Nottara in the 1893 staging), falling for the charms of the Orient; then returning to modern life under the spell of his new slave, a fellow Romanian "working girl". The text adapted synesthesic metaphors in depicting Mahmud's suicidal torpor, induced by tobacco or hashish.

With Ioan Bacalbașa, Demetriade co-wrote a history play, variously known as Asan or Frații Asan, which was part of the National Theater program in 1898 and 1899. The work dealt with the rise of Ivan Asen, founder of the Second Bulgarian Empire, and generally adhered to the factual narrative. However, as reviewer Ion Gorun argued, the play made Ivan seem "disagreeable", and was overall lacking in "uplifting emotions".

Demetriade's other poems were rhetorical, the imagery and themes romantic and Baudelairean; their subjects included demonism, genius, spiritual ascension and melancholy ("spleen"). His more experimental pieces included the 1906 sonnet Sonuri și culori ("Sounds and Colors"), which was heavily indebted to Rimbaud's synaesthesia, assigning deeper meanings to isolated vowels. Such work, often eroticized, received a radical critique from the traditionalist intellectuals of Transylvania: a reviewer for Rĕvașul newspaper, claiming to speak for his entire region, called Demetriade's "orgiastic" poems "an ugly torrent". According to Davidescu, Demetrescu's poetry mainly stands out for its sensuality and eroticism, "preserving the author's very character, which cannot but evoke to mind [...] that tanned man, as restless as a squirrel, with his black beard and eyes, always open to new sensations, always a man of his word, at once impulsive and self-contained, and always generous". Contrarily, the literary historian Șerban Cioculescu describes Demetriade, overall, as "faint and subdued".

=== Final years ===
Demetriade continued to play the unconventional poet, well-integrated in the atmosphere of the era's literary cafes. He embraced the peculiar lifestyle of literary bohemia. Writing in 1902, Macedonski described him as a "jester" who could prove himself "bitter", also noting that Demetriade's day started "at 3 o'clock in the afternoon". Such depictions were puzzling for the reading public, who wondered whether Macedonski was not in fact mocking his disciple. However, Demetriade remained among the most loyal Macedonskians, to 1904 and beyond. The younger Symbolist Mihail Cruceanu, who met Demetriade in Macedonski's salon in 1905, recalls him as a "Mefisto", who readily imparted his erotic escapades with the Literatorul crowd. He notes: "We the young ones we were looking up to him with much curiosity and sympathy, as he appeared to us as an elegant and fortunate satyr whose astuteness we could never match. But seeing as we were fatigued by the stories' emotionalism, we left for home at midnight, leaving him alone with his complete menu, to consume till dawn. Or so they tell me, since I, the aspiring poet, always went to bed before that time."

His final work in verse drama was Visul lui Ali ("Ali's Dream"). It premiered at the National Theater in autumn 1904. It was again taken up by the troupe in October 1912, and was put out in its definitive 1913 edition by nephew Eraclie Sterian. This writing was also heavily inspired by Macedonski's themes. It showed its hero, a destitute Muslim from Alexandria, rising to the position of Caliph—or merely imagining himself a Caliph. Călinescu finds the play, and other Demetriade fairy tales, to be hampered by "poor versification"; reportedly, it was also a commercial failure.

In tandem, Demetriade began writing for Constantin Ionescu-Caion's Românul daily, and penned his most significant critical essays for its successor, Românul Literar. Caion also hosted Demetriade's translations from Jean Moréas. In tandem, Demetriade began collaborating with Macedonski at his right-wing reviews Forța Morală and Liga Conservatoare, using such pen names as Ali-Baba, Demir, Dimir, and D. Mir. At the time, Literatorul called him "one of the greats of Romanian neo-Latin literature", noting that he still professed socialist principles, "but not those of the exploiting socialists". In 1906, as Mircea des Métriades, he prefaced the Parisian edition of Macedonski's novel, Thalassa, Le Calvaire de feu. Also that year, Carol I, King of Romania, awarded him the Bene-Merenti medal for his various contributions.

In April 1910, Demetriade became a founding member of the Society of Theatrical Authors, and, in 1911, was employed by the National Theater as a dramaturge, correcting and updating Rhea Sylvia, by Nicolae Scurtescu. Around that time, as concerned members of the Romanian Orthodox Church who opposed secularism, Demetriade and Sterian also joined the movement supporting Gherasim Safirin, the Bishop of Roman, in his conflict with the Romanian Synod. Both writers also shared similar ideas on heredity: Demetriade's claim that syphilis could act as a "civilizing hero", by favoring intellectual traits in syphilitic descendants, prompted Sterian to construct an elaborate evolutionary theory.

Demetriade's very final years brought a major chill in his relationship with Macedonski. According to one account, they were "daggers down" (la cuțite). He died on September 11, 1914, shortly after the start of World War I. His lifelong output included over fifteen hundred poems, plays, translations and articles of literary criticism (the most significant of which appeared in Românul Literar), mainly uncollected in book form. He had fathered a son, Mircea Jr, who was reportedly a "guiding light of his life".
