= Roundel (disambiguation) =

General meanings of Roundel include:

- Roundel, a circular symbol
  - used in heraldry: Roundel (heraldry)
  - used on military aircraft as a sign of nationality: Military aircraft insignia
- Roundel enclosure, a Neolithic monument type: Neolithic circular enclosures in Central Europe
- Roundel (fortification), a type of circular artillery tower
- A small circular church window
- A Rondel dagger, a circular knife
- A Tondo (art), a large circular piece of art
- Roundel (poetry), a form of verse in English language poetry
- A signal roundel, a circular disk of colored glass or other translucent material for filtering white light to produce a traffic signal or railway signal of a specific color

Specific instances

- London Underground Roundel, the logo for transport in London
- Royal Air Force roundels, identification marks used by the British Airforces
- Roundel (magazine), a monthly periodical from the BMW Car Club of America
- "Roundel: The little eyes that never knew Light", a song by Sir Edward Elgar to a verse by A. C. Swinburne

== See also ==
- Rondache, a small circular shield, used by soldiers in the fourteenth and fifteenth centuries
- Rondel (disambiguation)
