= Rondelle =

Rondelle or Rondelles may refer to:

- La Rondelle, the corporate headquarters of Air Canada
- The Rondelles, an American indie band
- Rondelle Yearwood (born 1975), Barbadian cricketer
- Rondelle, a type of culinary knife cut
- Rondelle, also known as “country onion”, is a nut of a plant Afrostyrax lepidophyllus.

== See also ==
- Hans Karl LaRondelle (1929–2011), Dutch-born American Seventh-day Adventist theologian
- Rondel (disambiguation)
- Rondell (disambiguation)
- Roundel (disambiguation)
