= Fântâni =

Fântâni may refer to several villages in Romania:

- Fântâni, a village in Goiești Commune, Dolj County
- Fântâni, a village in Nicorești Commune, Galaţi County
