= Poema rondelurilor =

Collection of rondel cycles

Poema rondelurilor is the title of a 1927 collection of rondel cycles by the Romanian poet Alexandru Macedonski. It contains the following rondels divided into the following cycles:

- Rondelurile pribege
  - Rondelul lucrurilor
  - Rondelul oraşului mic
  - Rondelul de aur
  - Rondelul lunii
  - Rondelul crinilor
  - Rondelul ţiganilor
  - Rondelul cercetaşilor
  - Rondelul plecării
  - Rondelul oraşului din Indii
  - Rondelul morii
  - Rondelul contemporanilor
  - Rondelul meu
- Rondelurile celor patru vânturi
  - Rondelul cupei de Murano
  - Rondelul privighetoarei
  - Rondelul trecutului
  - Rondelul oglindei
  - Rondelul domniţei
  - Rondelul oraşului de altădată
  - Rondelul orelor
  - Rondelul ajungerii la cer
  - Rondelul ctitorilor
  - Rondelul coroanelor nepieritoare
- Rondelurile rozelor
  - Rondelul rozelor ce mor
  - Rondelul lui Saadi
  - Rondelul rozelor din Cişmegi
  - Rondelul marilor roze
  - Rondelul beat de roze
  - Rondelul cascadelor de roze
  - Rondelul privighetoarei între roze
  - Rondelul rozelor de august
  - Rondelul rozei ce înfloreşte
  - Rondelul lui Saadi ieşind dintre roze
- Rondelurile rozelor de azi şi de ieri
  - Rondelul rozelor de azi şi de ieri
  - Rondelul nopţii argintate
- Rondelurile Senei
  - Rondelul înecaţilor
  - Rondelul florilor de lună
  - Rondelul Parisului iad
  - Rondelul dezastrului mondial
  - Rondelul uriaşului
  - Rondelul ticăloşilor
  - Rondelul înălţimilor
  - Rondelul Franţei burgheze
  - Rondelul duminicilor de la Bellevue
  - Rondelul sfârşitului
- Rondelurile de porţelan
  - Rondelul lui Tsing-Ly-Tsi
  - Rondelul podului de onix
  - Rondelul pagodei
  - Rondelul apei din ograda japonezului
  - Rondelul muzmeiei
  - Rondelul opiumului
  - Rondelul Mării Japoneze
  - Rondelul crizantemei
  - Rondelul Ioshiwarei
  - Rondelul chinezilor din Paris
  - Epigraf final
