= Horia Furtună =

Romanian poet, playwright and prose writer

Horia Furtună (June 21, 1888 – March 8, 1952) was a Romanian poet, playwright and prose writer.

Born in Focșani, his father Ioan Ștefănescu was inspector general of the veterinary service; his mother was Speranța-Plautina (née Vasiliu). In 1883, his father formally changed his surname to Furtună. Horia studied law at the University of Paris, graduating in 1909 and earning a doctorate in 1915; his thesis dealt with legal remedies for insurers faced with risk created by third parties to contracts. From 1915, he practiced law at the Ilfov County bar, and then directed the theatre service of Radiodifuziunea Română from 1934 to 1948. Together with Ion Pillat and Adrian Maniu, he headed Flacăra magazine in 1916. He and Pillat founded the Cărțile albe collection, which put out Alexandru Macedonski's Flori sacre in 1912. From 1916 to 1918, he fought in World War I, being taken prisoner and interned at Stralsund.

His literary debut took place in the Adevărul supplement in 1902, and involved the comic-heroic tale "Iarba fiarelor". He sometimes used the pen names Aghiuță, Ariel, Spiriduș, Licurici and Henri Loria. In 1919, he joined the Romanian Writers' Society, and formed part of the leadership for a time; he was also vice president of the Dramatic Authors' Society, and as such took part in several international congresses. He was elected to the Assembly of Deputies. His work ran in Noi pagini literare, Flacăra, Cugetul românesc, Adevărul literar și artistic, Gândirea, Rampa, Viața literară, Revista Fundațiilor Regale and Mișcarea literară magazines; his humorous output was published in Papagalul and Gluma. He translated Waldemar Bonsels, Edvard Robert Gummerus and Georg Trakl, as well as opera librettos. A gifted orator, he had an erudite, captivating and persuasive style, imbued with a caustic pathos. He held frequent conferences, his speeches subsequently appearing in brochures. He left three plays in manuscript form: Nicolae Bălcescu, O seară la teatru and Băieți buni. Furtună introduced classical touches to various themes, his work being a synthesis of intellect and craftsmanship. He won the Romanian Writers' Society Prize in 1934.
