= Rondelet =

French form of poetry

The rondelet is a brief French form of poetry. It contains a single septet, refrain, a strict rhyme scheme and a distinct meter pattern.

Rondelet is the diminutive of rondel, a similar, longer verse form. This is the basic structure:

- Line 1: $\mathrm{A}$—four syllables
- Line 2: $\mathrm{b}$—eight syllables
- Line 3: $\mathrm{A}$—repeat of line one
- Line 4: $\mathrm{a}$—eight syllables
- Line 5: $\mathrm{b}$—eight syllables
- Line 6: $\mathrm{b}$—eight syllables
- Line 7: $\mathrm{A}$—repeat of line one

The refrained lines should contain the same words, however substitution or different use of punctuation on the lines has been common.

== Etymology ==
The term "roundelay" originates from 1570, from Modern French rondelet, a diminutive of rondel meaning "short poem with a refrain," literally "small circle". From Old French rondel, a diminutive of rond meaning "circle, sphere," originally an adjective from roont. The spelling developed by association with lay (noun) "poem to be sung."

A Roundelay can be any simple lyric with a refrain, but in prosody, a roundelay is a 24-line poem with a refrain and regularly repeating rhyme structure.
