= Alexandru Obedenaru =

Romanian poet and journalist (1865–1945)

Alexandru Obedenaru (July 13, 1865 – January 13, 1945) was a Romanian poet and journalist.

== Biography ==
Born in Bucharest, he worked as a caretaker at the Romanian Academy's library. Obedenaru was steeped in the Bohemian literary milieu at the turn of the 20th century, frequenting Alexandru Macedonski's Literatorul circle. His main contributions appeared in publications associated with the local Symbolist movement: Literatorul, Generația nouă, Ilustrațiunea română, Liga literară, Revista literară, Românul literar and Vieața nouă, but also in Convorbiri Literare, Biblioteca Familiei, Epoca, Literatură și artă română, Luceafărul, Telegraful român and Tribuna literară. In 1891, he directed Revista poporului. He published in Universul and Propilee literare after World War I.

Forgotten after a long absence from writing, he submitted youthful memories and autobiographical fragments to Adevărul and Dimineața late in life, in 1933. He used the pen name Al. S. Georgiad Obedenaru while writing in Opinca from 1884. His first book was the 1891 Spleen, followed by Sonete (1916), Dacia noastră (1919), Himere (1927) and Pantheea (1927). His work appeared in Nicolae Davidescu's 1943 Symbolist anthology Din poezia noastră parnasiană. Obedenaru was one of the minor "decadent" poets from the end of the 19th century, with a propensity for the macabre, Satanism and shadowy worlds. His verses display a marked reverence for fixed forms (sonnets, roundels) and an attraction to Symbolist-Parnassian images.
