= Rondell =

Rondell may refer to:

== People ==
- Rondell Bartholomew (born 1990), Grenadian 400 metre runner
- Ron'Dell Carter (born 1997), American football player

=== Surname ===
- Cregg Rondell, vocalist in Boy Hits Car
- Ronnie Rondell Jr. (1937–2025), American actor, stuntman and stunt coordinator

== Places ==
- Rondell, a name of the Mehringplatz in Berlin, Germany, from 1734 to 1815

== Music ==
- The Rondells, redirects to Delbert McClinton
- The Rondelles, are an indiepop band originally from Albuquerque, New Mexico.
- Rondell (Pole single), a single by the musician Pole (musician)

== See also ==
- Rundell, fictional friend of the fictional character Charles Gunn who appears in Belonging (Angel episode)
- Rondel (disambiguation)
- Rondelle (disambiguation)
