= Ion Pillat =

Romanian poet (1891 - 1945)

- Ion Pillat
- Born: 31 March 1891; Bucharest, Kingdom of Romania
- Died: 17 April 1945 (aged 54); Bucharest, Kingdom of Romania
- Education: University of Paris
- Occupations: poet; lawyer
- Spouse: Maria Pillat-Brateș
- Children: Dinu; Pia
- Writing career
- Language: Romanian

Ion Pillat (31 March 1891 – 17 April 1945) was a distinguished Romanian poet. He is best known for his volume Pe Argeș în sus (Upstream on the Argeș) and Poeme într-un vers (One-line poems), and for his embryonic love for his Moldavian & Muntenian boyar villages Florica & Miorcani, depictured in all his Poetry.

His maternal grandfather was Ion Brătianu. He studied at the University of Paris from 1910 to 1914, returning to Bucharest after obtaining a law degree, and also an agriculture degree.

== Biography ==
=== Childhood ===
Ion Pillat was born on 31 March 1891, in Bucharest. The Pillats were an old family of free farmers, originally from the Prut River valley. His father, Ion N. Pillat, was a landowner and parliamentarian. His mother, Maria Brătianu, was the second daughter of the political leader Ion C. Brătianu. His elementary education took place in the town of Pitești.

In 1910, he enrolled in a student at the Sorbonne, where he studied mainly literature, history and geography, but he also studied law. Titu Maiorescu published some of his poems in 1911 in Convorbiri Literare. In 1912, while on holiday in Bucharest, he met Alexandru Macedonski, to whom he published the volume Flori sacre. Ion Pillat, together with Horia Furtună, founded the collection White Books, in which the poets of the time were to be published; the debut volume of the entire collection was Sacred Flowers.

=== Adolescence and studies in France ===
At the age of fourteen, he finished a course of study at Saint Sava National College in Bucharest. His mother brought him, together with his younger brother Niculae and younger sister Pia, to study at the Lycée Henri-IV in Paris, living on the Boulevard Saint-Michel. During a trip to Chartres Cathedral, inspired by the gothic architecture, he composed his first poem, În catedrală ("In the cathedral"). He enrolled in the Sorbonne to study liberal arts and law, obtaining degrees in 1913 and 1914, respectively.
