= Roundel: The little eyes that never knew Light =

"Roundel: The little eyes that never knew Light" is a song with piano accompaniment written by the English composer Edward Elgar in 1897. The words are from the fourth roundel of a poem A Baby's Death written by A. C. Swinburne and originally published in the book A Century of Roundels.

Its first performance was at a Worcester Musical Union meeting of 26 April 1897, sung by Miss Gertrude Walker, accompanied by the composer. Gertrude Walker was the daughter of the Thomas Walker, rector of St. Peter's Church in the Worcestershire village of Abbots Morton — she played the organ there and trained the choir, and had already known Elgar for many years.

The song was not published in the composer's lifetime, but is now in the Elgar Society Edition.

== Lyrics ==
The little eyes that never knew
Light other than of dawning skies,
What new life now lights up anew
The little eyes?

Who knows but on their sleep may rise
Such light as never heaven let through
To lighten earth from Paradise?

No storm, we know, may change the blue
Soft heaven that haply death descries
No tears, like these in ours, bedew
The little eyes.

== Recordings ==
"The Unknown Elgar" includes "Roundel: The little eyes that never knew Light" performed by Teresa Cahill (soprano), with Barry Collett (piano).
