= Flori sacre =

Flori sacre (English: Sacred Flowers) is the title of a 1912 collection of poetry by Romanian poet Alexandru Macedonski. This collection, first issued by Revista Critică (English: The Critical Review), contains the following poems:

- Avatar
- Noaptea de decembrie
- Mai
- Imn la Satan
- Castelul
- Vasul
- Corabia
- Mănăstirea
- Cântecul ploaiei
- Rimele cântă pe harpă
- Dor zadarnic
- Lui Cetalo Pol
- Lewki
- Năluca unei nopţi
- O umbră de dincolo de Styx
- Oh! suflet orb
- Perihelie
