= Anghel Demetriescu =

Romanian historian and writer

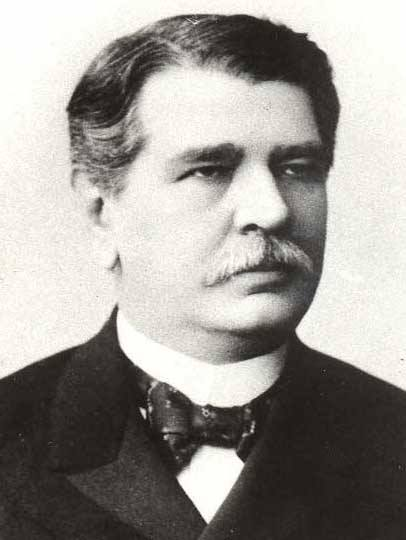
- Born: October 5, 1847; Alexandria, Wallachia
- Died: July 18, 1903 (aged 55); Karlovy Vary, Austria-Hungary
- Resting place: Bellu Cemetery
- Education: National College "Sfântul Sava" of Bucharest
- Occupations: Historian and Writer
- Spouse: 1873: Maria Popovici (divorced 1882) 1884: Emma Gluck (deceased 1902)
- Children: Cordelia Demetriescu Theophil Demetriescu
- Parents: Dumitru Simion (father); Chrysanta Velleanu (mother)

Anghel Demetriescu (October 5, 1847 - July 18, 1903) was a Romanian historian, writer and literary critic, who became a member of the Romanian Academy in 1902.

== Childhood and studies ==
Anghel Demetriescu was born on October 5, 1847, in Alexandria, province of Teleorman, Romania, then under the Ottoman Empire. He was the son of Dumitru Simion, a dyer who owned a small dying studio in the city, and Chrysanta Simion (née Velleanu), the latter who hailed from a wealthier family, her brother being a doctor who worked in Bucharest. It is speculated that he was unsatisfied with his family name and thereby changed it to Demetriescu. His given name was given to him by his godfather, Anghel Dudrea of Alexandria. Not even his given name satisfied him, as he would often sign his name Ang. Demetriescu.

Being the third of nine children of a modest family, Demetriescu had a rough upbringing. He was nevertheless a brilliant student in primary school, to the extent that his parents were urged to encourage him to continue pursuing his studies. Consequently, they enrolled him at Școala Reală in Alexandria (which later became the secondary school Alexandru Ghica). Afterwards, he received a scholarship at Bucharest, first enrolling in the courses at Matei Basarab High School, and then at Sf. Sava High School.

Without passing the baccalaureate, Demetriescu continued his studies at the College of Letters in Bucharest where he befriended Dimitrie August Laurian and Ștefan C. Michăilescu, forming a group that gained some notoriety in the college, where they were called "The Three". To sustain himself financially, Demetriescu worked as an educator at the Macedo-Romanian School, a position which he obtained with the help of Corneliu Diaconovich.

After completing his college courses, Demetriescu did not pass his licensing examination or the baccalaureate exam at the culmination of high school. As a result, some contemporaries considered him self-educated. V.D. Păun, one of his close friends and director and professor of Romanian language and literature at the Gheorghe Lazăr High School in Bucharest commented this in regards to Demetriescu:

"Demetriescu was not exactly what one would call self-educated, as some determined him to be and others understood him to be. It is true that he did not possess any academic titles, not even the baccalaureate. He became a professor in 1869, a time when simply graduating high school was still sufficient for competing for a chair at a faculty, whether secondary or university."

After finishing his studies at the College of Letters, Demetriescu began his didactic and publishing activity. However, in 1878, through a competition at the Ministry of Culture, he received a scholarship for foreign studies of philology and left for Berlin to complete his literary and historical studies.

== Publications ==
Demetriescu published a Greek grammar (Primele elemente de grammatica ellena, 1872), a secondary school geometry text (Elemente de geografie, 1873), a commission by the Romanian Literary Society of a translation of the Roman history of Cassius Dio (Istoria romana della Nerone pene la Alexandru Severu, 1878), an edition of Barbu Catargiu's speeches with a biography (Discursurile – Culese și însoție de o notiță istorică a familiei Katargiu și de o biobrafie a autorului, 1886), a translation of Lord Macaulay's Speeches (Discursuri – Traduse din limba engleză și adnotate, 1895) and published widely in Romanian magazines.
