= Goiești =

- Commune
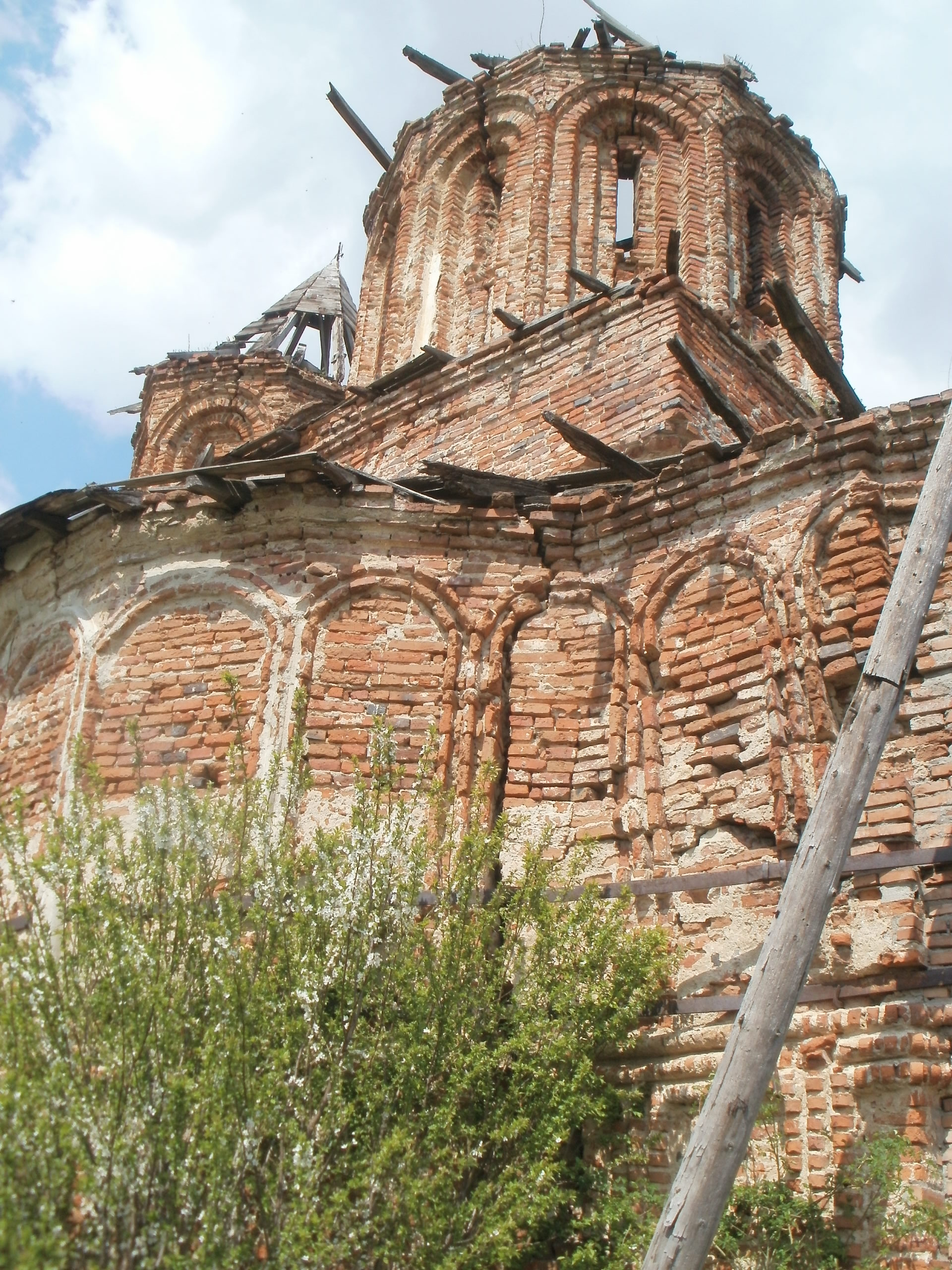
- Church of the Ascension in Gruița

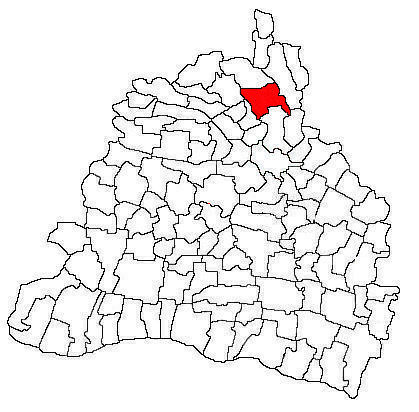
- Location in Dolj County

- Location in Romania
- Coordinates: 44°29′11″N 23°45′14″E
- Country: Romania
- County: Dolj

Government
  - Mayor (2020–2024): Gheorghe Corbeanu (PSD)
- Area: 78.49 km^{2} (30.31 sq mi)
- Elevation: 126 m (413 ft)
- Population (2021-12-01): 3,138
  - Density: 39.98/km^{2} (103.5/sq mi)
- Time zone: UTC+02:00 (EET)
  - Summer (DST): UTC+03:00 (EEST)
- Postal code: 207310
- Area code: +(40) 251
- Vehicle reg.: DJ
- Website: primariagoiesti.ro

Goiești is a commune in Dolj County, Oltenia, Romania. It is composed of thirteen villages: Adâncata, Fântâni, Goiești, Gruița, Mălăești, Mogoșești, Muereni, Piorești, Pometești, Popeasa, Țandăra, Vladimir, and Zlătari.
