= Roundel (poetry) =

A roundel (not to be confused with the rondel) is a form of verse used in English language poetry devised by Algernon Charles Swinburne (1837–1909). It is the Anglo-Norman form corresponding to the French rondeau. It makes use of refrains, repeated according to a certain stylized pattern. A roundel consists of nine lines each having the same number of syllables, plus a refrain after the third line and after the last line. The refrain must be identical with the beginning of the first line: it may be a half-line, and rhymes with the second line. It has three stanzas and its rhyme scheme is as follows: $\mathrm{A \,\, B \,\, A \,\, R}$; $\mathrm{B \,\, A \,\, B}$; $\mathrm{A \,\, B \,\, A \,\, R}$; where $\mathrm{R}$ is the refrain.

Swinburne had published a book A Century of Roundels. He dedicated these poems to his friend Christina Rossetti, who then started writing roundels herself, as evidenced by the following examples from her anthology of poetry: Wife to Husband; A Better Resurrection; A Life's Parallels; Today for me; It is finished; From Metastasio.

== Examples ==
Swinburne’s first roundel was called "The roundel":

A roundel is wrought as a ring or a starbright sphere, (A)
With craft of delight and with cunning of sound unsought, (B)
That the heart of the hearer may smile if to pleasure his ear (A)
A roundel is wrought. (R)

Its jewel of music is carven of all or of aught - (B)
Love, laughter, or mourning - remembrance of rapture or fear - (A)
That fancy may fashion to hang in the ear of thought. (B)

As a bird's quick song runs round, and the hearts in us hear (A)
Pause answer to pause, and again the same strain caught, (B)
So moves the device whence, round as a pearl or tear, (A)
A roundel is wrought. (R)

Swinburne’s poem "A baby's death" contains seven roundels. The fourth roundel became the song "Roundel: The little eyes that never knew Light," set to music by the English composer Edward Elgar.

== See also ==
- Rondel (poem)
- Rondeau (poetry)
