= Rondel (poem) =

Verse form in 14th-century French poetry

A rondel is a verse form originating in French lyrical poetry of the 14th century (closely related to the rondeau, as well as the rondelet). Specifically, the rondel refers to "a form with two rhymes, three stanzas, and a two-line refrain that repeats either two and a half or three times: ABba abAB abbaA(B)."

Rhyming scheme - $\mathrm{ABba \,\, abAB \,\, abbaA(B)}$

== Definition ==
Scholars have observed that the rondel is a relatively fluid construction, not always adhering to strict formal definitions. J.M. Cocking wrote that "the reader who comes across a poem bearing the title rondel by Banville, Rollinat, Dobson or Bridges and is curious enough to look for a definition of this form is likely to be more confused than enlightened." Jeremy Butterfield, writing for Fowler's Dictionary of Modern English Usage, goes so far as to state that "there is no fixed metre" for the rondel.

== Origins and evolution ==
The origins of the rondel, however, are not so mysterious as its definition. The rondel first rose to prominence as a monophonic song in the 13th century and was associated with "round" folk dances.

Later, famed Middle English poet Geoffrey Chaucer would adapt the French Rondel to serve as the basis for The Knight's Tale. In the Chaucerian Rondel, two tercets followed by a quatrain comprise each stanza. Later, English poet and critic Algernon Charles Swinburne would devise the roundel, a form based on the rondeau rather than Chaucer's Rondel.

== See also ==
- Pierrot lunaire (book)
- Rondeau (forme fixe)
- Rondelet, a shorter variant
