= Bonifaciu Florescu =

Romanian polygraph (1848–1899)

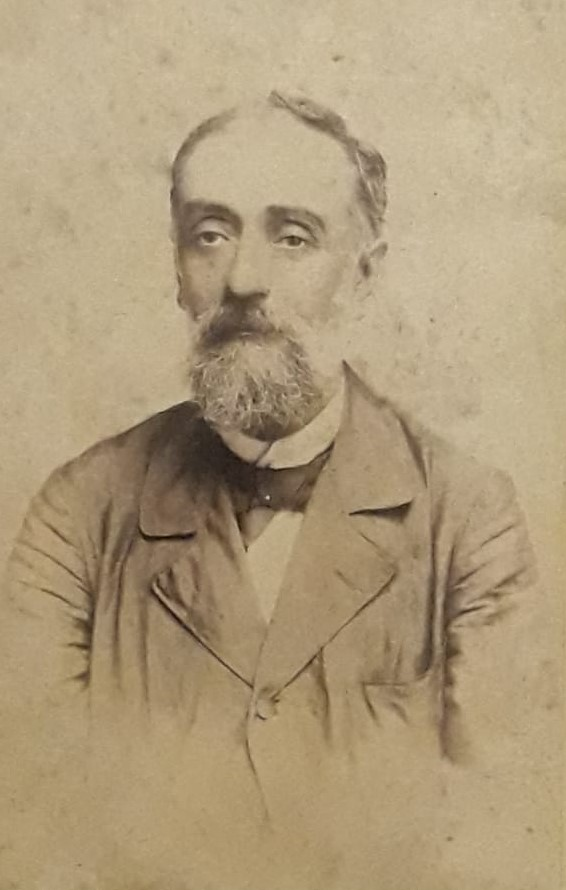
- Florescu, ca. 1890
- Born: Bonifacius Florescu; May 17, 1848; Pest, Kingdom of Hungary
- Died: December 18, 1899 (aged 51); Bucharest, Kingdom of Romania
- Occupations: Historian; philosopher; critic; journalist; poet; translator; academic; publisher; lexicographer; politician
- Spouse: Rose-Henriette Le Roho d'Alcobia
- Writing career
- Pen name: Boniface Floresco; Bonifacio Florescu; Bonifati Florescu
- Period: ca. 1865–1899
- Genres: Lyric poetry; wisdom poetry; prose poem; epistolary novel; essay; aphorism; biography
- Literary movement: Neoclassicism; Didacticism; Literatorul; Decadence

Bonifaciu Florescu (Romanian pronunciation: [boniˈfat͡ʃju floˈresku]; first name also Boniface, Bonifacio, Bonifati, last name also Floresco; born Bonifacius Florescu; May 17, 1848 – December 18, 1899) was a Romanian polygraph, the illegitimate son of writer-revolutionary Nicolae Bălcescu. Born secretly outside his parents' native Wallachia, at Pest, he was taken by his aristocratic mother in France, growing up as an erudite Francophone and Francophile. Florescu graduated from the Lycée Louis-le-Grand and the University of Rennes, returning home at age 25 to become a successful lecturer, polemicist, and historian of culture. Influenced by his father's politics, he was for a while a prominent figure on the far-left of Romanian liberalism and nationalism, which pitted him against the conservative society Junimea, and against his own conservative cousin, Prime Minister Ioan Emanoil Florescu. The conflict led to his losing a professorship at Iași University and being sidelined when applying for chairs at the University of Bucharest. His critique of Junimist literature, structured around a classical defense of prosody, inspired a libel by Mihai Eminescu—famously depicting Florescu as a "homunculus".

Florescu had significant success as a self-proclaimed irredentist, agitating for Romanian causes in disputed Bukovina and Transylvania. Ultimately, however, he failed in his bid to rise through the National Liberal Party, as the latter moved to the center, and fell back on independent journalism, founding several periodicals of his own. He had a long but interrupted collaboration with another dissident liberal and poet, Alexandru Macedonski, who co-opted him on his Literatorul editing team during the 1880s. A precursor, but not an affiliate, of the Romanian Symbolist movement, Florescu had steadier friendships with the younger Symbolists Mircea Demetriade and Iuliu Cezar Săvescu. His main contribution to pre-Symbolist belles-lettres is prose poetry in the manner of Catulle Mendès.

A committed bohemian, whose lifestyle interfered with his literary output and his teaching job at Saint Sava, Florescu is sometimes read as a herald of decadent writing. He was important to the Macedonskian Symbolists for his familiarity with French culture, but was primarily an expert in 18th-century literature. His criticism, modeled on Villemain, Sainte-Beuve and Taine, was perceived as refined in its context, but later enlisted objections for its pedantry and amateurism. He was a prolific translator passionate about exotic topics, authoring some of the first Romanian versions of stories by Edgar Allan Poe.

== Biography ==
=== Origins ===
Born a Wallachian subject, Bonifaciu Florescu descended from the boyar nobility: the Bălcescus recognized him as a family member; the Florescus, however, refused to accept that Nicolae Bălcescu was the father. His father's family, of lesser rank and prestige, had been founded by Father Necula, a Wallachian Orthodox parson, who purchased the Bălcești estate in 1766. Unusually rich for his social position, he bought for his sons small boyar offices. Despite taking the same name, Nicolae and his two brothers descended from the clan through their mother Zinca; she married Pitar Barbu sin Petre Căpitanul—a gentleman farmer of Prahova, who also owned townhouses in Bucharest. Barbu's financial troubles and quick death contributed to the family's marginalization.

The poet's mother, Alexandrina "Luxița" Florescu, claimed direct descent from Wallachian Prince Michael the Brave, and was the daughter of Logothete Iordache Florescu, as well as aunt of Ioan Emanoil Florescu, the Wallachian militia chief. The family also had Greek and Albanian ancestors. Iordache, a Ghica on his mother's side, ran in the 1842 election for the Wallachian throne, under the Regulamentul Organic regime; his wife, Anica, was a Soutzos. At age 17, Luxița was married off to a Russian Pole, but divorced him in 1836, alleging that he was hypersexual; he was probably also an alcoholic. She may have then met Bălcescu at the Florescu home in Șerban-Vodă, Bucharest, which functioned as a club for progressive intellectuals; however, Bonifaciu was most likely conceived while the couple reunited in Paris. Reportedly, Bălcescu, ill with tuberculosis and absorbed by his conspiratorial work, informed Luxița that they could never be married, which she accepted.

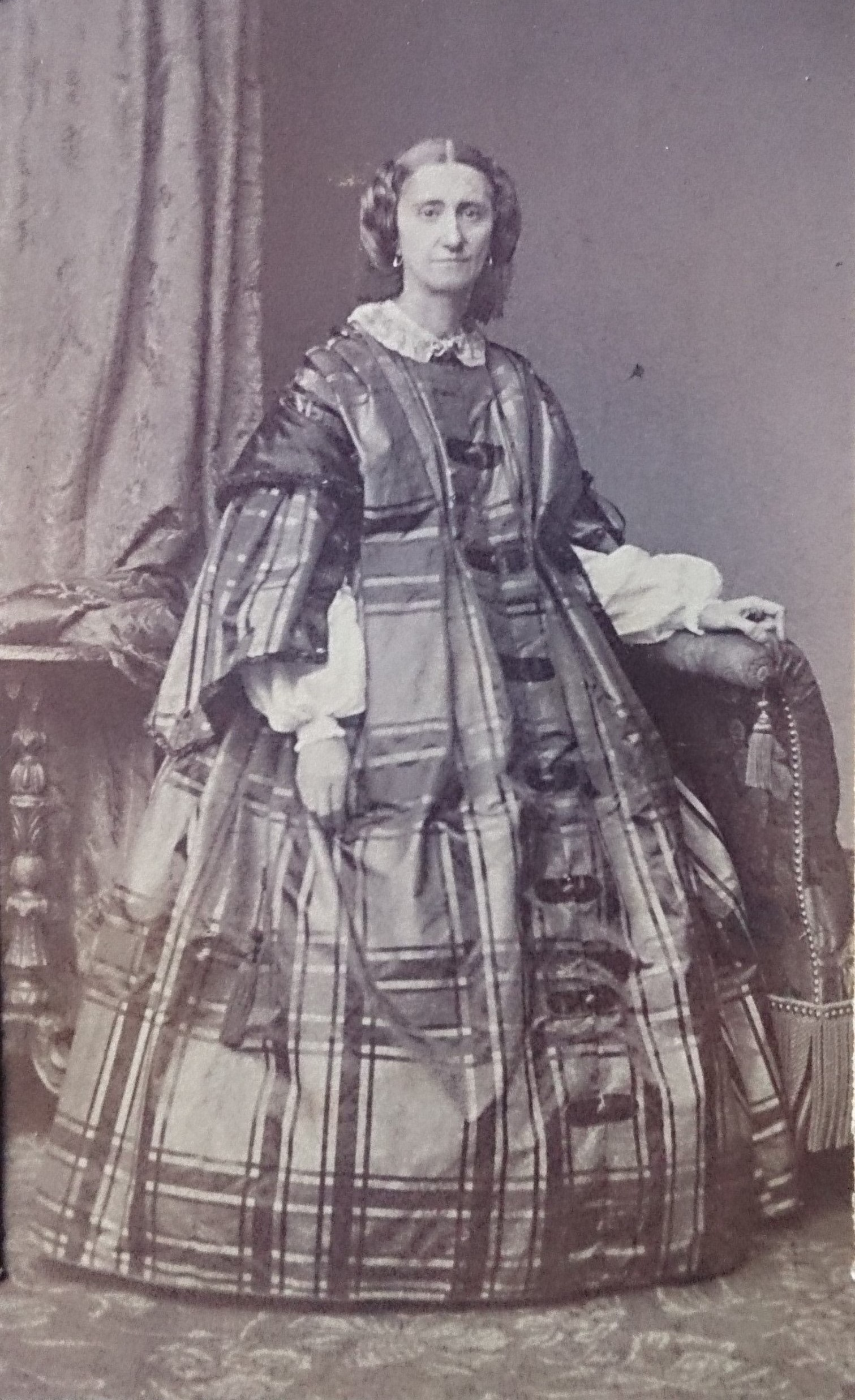
Luxița Florescu, Bonifaciu Florescu's mother (author unknown)

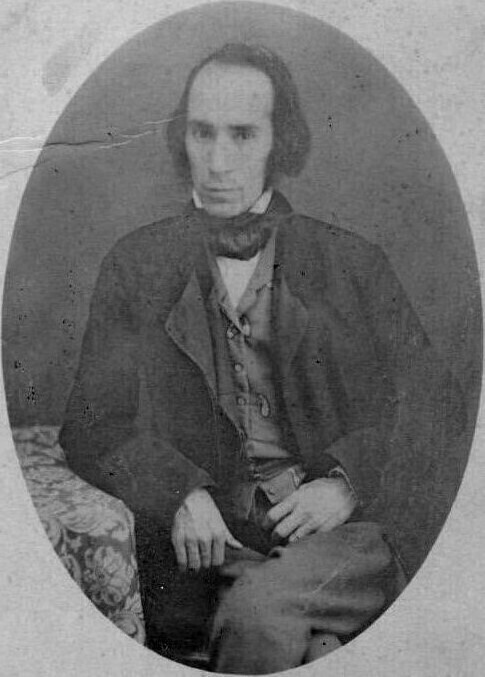
Nicolae Bălcescu, Bonifaciu's father

Florescu family coat of arms

Youth from both families were deeply involved in the Wallachian revolution of 1848, which occurred some weeks after Bonifaciu's birth. Luxița was shielded by her brothers in the Kingdom of Hungary, without informing Nicolae of her whereabouts or her pregnancy, until after she delivered. Bonifaciu was thus born in Pest; his date of birth is variously given as May 14, May 17, or May 27. In July, he was baptized into Orthodoxy at a Pest chapel shared by the Greek and Romanian Orthodox churches. The baptismal record omits mention of his father's family name, but indicates his godfather as Inochentie Chițulescu (future Bishop of Buzău).

By July, Bălcescu had been appointed foreign minister of revolutionary Wallachia, but then a reshuffle pushed him into the background. Eventually, the Russian and Ottoman empires intervened militarily, and the revolutionaries were pushed into exile or imprisoned. Brothers Nicolae and Costache Bălcescu escaped to Paris, passing through insurgent Hungary; the third Bălcescu brother, Barbu, was taken to Istanbul as a hostage. Three of Luxița's brothers—Iancu, Dumitrache, and Costache Florescu—participated in the events, and played a part in the shootout with the loyalist Colonel Grigore Lăcusteanu, whom they eventually arrested. Unusually, Costache Florescu's daughter married Lăcusteanu's brother Iancu while the colonel was still in captivity. All three brothers were repressed during the foreign intervention: Iancu Florescu was arrested by the Russians and spent some eight years in Siberia, returning after the Crimean War removed Wallachia from the Russian sphere of influence; Costache and Dumitrache were taken into Ottoman custody, returning after nine years of exile in Bursa. While Iancu took up law practice, Dumitrache is best known for setting to music the poetry of Vasile Alecsandri.

With material support from Chițulescu, Luxița and her son returned to Wallachia in 1850. Although she only formally adopted Bonifaciu in 1858, to solidify his claim to the Florescu estate, he grew up knowing that the exiled Bălcescu was his father. Prevented from returning home (with a brief exception in August 1852, when he only met Zinca at Turnu Măgurele), Nicolae died in the Two Siciles (November 1852). His grave is presumed lost.

=== French studies and 1873 return ===
Luxița and Bonifaciu were also largely absent from Wallachia as the country merged with Moldavia into the United Principalities (the basis for modern Romania). Bonifaciu attended Lycée Louis-le-Grand in Paris, living with his mother on Rue Saint-Jacques, and possibly obtaining a scholarship from the Romanian government. He grew up speaking French at home, and only later perfected his Romanian, which he always spoke with an accent and a guttural R. His impromptu versions of Romanian orthography reflected phonemic spelling with unusual consistency for his day, and they unwittingly recorded his own difficulties in pronouncing Romanian words. This trait was ridiculed by philologist Hanes Suchianu as the very "apex of phoneticism". He would also confuse working-class Romanians by code-switching between Romanian and French. In one instance, he asked a Bucharest coachman to drive him à la maison (French for "where I live"), only to discover that he was being taken instead to Malmaison prison.

Familiarized with Bălcescu's works by age 17, Bonifaciu declared his father to have been a "genius", "Romania's only prose writer". He followed Nicolae's radical orientation, declaring the French Revolution as the "triumph of justice, liberty and equality, and a great step toward fraternity"; he also took up the cause of Pan-Europeanism, arguing for "one great European republic, as in America." Reading up on the events at home, Florescu was indignant about the 1866 coup against Domnitor Alexandru Ioan Cuza. In his view, Cuza, albeit ruling with an "authoritarian hand", was preferable to the foreign-born replacement Carol of Hohenzollern. Passionate about literature, Florescu and his colleague Frédéric Damé set up their own newspaper, L'Avenir ("The Future"), which only put out a few issues.

Florescu was described by teachers and relatives as a charming but inattentive student, and was once moved to a remedial class, ultimately obtaining his baccalauréat in August 1868. In October 1872, he graduated from the literature faculty of the University of Rennes. From mid 1873, he returned with his mother to Bucharest, where she became the curator of a retirement home maintained by the Sisters of Charity. Her son debuted in the Romanian press with an overview of history as reflected in Romanian folklore; it was hosted in Românul, published by C. A. Rosetti (July–August 1873). On October 3, Florescu married Rose-Henriette Le Roho d'Alcobia (born 1849), the orphaned scion of an Anglo-French-Portuguese family. According to one account, they did not have any children of their own, but later adopted a boy named Ion. Contrarily, literary historian George Călinescu suggests that Ion was the couple's natural son, "a direct descendant of Nicolae Bălcescu".

On October 5, following an examination performed by historian Bogdan Petriceicu Hasdeu, Florescu had obtained a "provisional" professorate at the department of world literature within the literature faculty of Iași University. He thus replaced Nicolae Ionescu, who preferred to keep his seat in the Assembly of Deputies. Researcher George Porta suggests that Florescu never actually took hold of his chair, being snubbed by two successive Education Ministers: Christian Tell and Vasile Boerescu. However, his introductory lesson was published in Hasdeu's newspaper, Columna lui Traian, which also hosted Florescu's homage to the retiring poet Grigore Alexandrescu. During his time in Iași, Florescu, supported by physician Anastasie Fătu, also founded and operated an adult high school.

=== Clash with Junimea ===
In April 1874, a conservative coalition that included Junimea society of Iași formed the national government, with Lascăr Catargiu as Prime Minister. The cabinet had Bonifaciu's cousin, Ioan Emanoil Florescu, for a Defense Minister—described by critics as authoritarian in his handling of political opposition. Bonifaciu himself was dismissed immediately by the new Education Minister, Junimist ideologue Titu Maiorescu, who "could not stand him." In his official report, Maiorescu noted that, although Florescu was an erudite, his peculiar teaching style was driving students away.

This dispute doubled as a cultural conflict between liberals such as Florescu and Junimea. Florescu spent much of his time in polemics with the minister, and also with the Junimist poet Mihail Eminescu. The latter scandal began in January 1876 with Florescu's derisive note in Românul. Here, Florescu attacked Junimism (and implicitly Eminescu's work) as a "torrent of little poets"—although, in the same text, he praised Eminescu's lover Veronica Micle for her own "beautiful" verse. Declaring himself dissatisfied with the assonance of Junimist poetry, Florescu demanded a more thorough literary consonance. As noted later by the critic Perpessicius, this request was "bizarre" and "drunk on prosody", although Florescu had "his indisputable merits." Perpessicius also proposes that it formed part of a press campaign "in bad taste", "as vociferous as it was impotent", seeking to undermine Junimea's steady rise, with Florescu "in so very many ways, from the pestering to the inept, ready to censor Eminescu's budding oeuvre." Florescu's review was immediately challenged by Nicolae Scurtescu, who sent Românul a letter in which he expressed solidarity with Eminescu, and asked to be struck out from Florescu's list of "good poets", suggesting that Florescu had no qualification to compile such lists.

Eminescu would also respond later in 1876 with the libel Epistolă deschisă homunculului Bonifaciu ("An Open Letter to Bonifaciu the Homunculus"). Its reference to a mysterious newspaper, Pruncul ("The Babe"), was later identified as a jibe at Românul, whose predecessor was an 1848 sheet, Pruncul Român ("The Romanian Infant"). The "letter", written in tones of "rising anger", reads:

Azi venind din întâmplare și sub ochii noștri Pruncul,
Am citit critic-adâncă renumitului homuncul,
El cu mintea sa câlțoasă și cu stil greoi, bombastic —
Cearcă să ne-arate nouă ce-i frumos și ce e plastic,
Întinzând pe-a noastre versuri groasa minții sale labă,
El ni spune cum se cade să rimeze un om de treabă.

Translation:

Just today, as we were handed that one sheet they call the Pruncul,
It so happened that we read some big critique from the homuncule.
His mind fuzzy, filled with oakum, his style laden and bombastic,
Planning nonetheless to teach us words of beauty, art that's plastic;
Dragging his stiff paws of wisdom into verse that we had made,
He expects that decent people will take note, like he's obeyed.

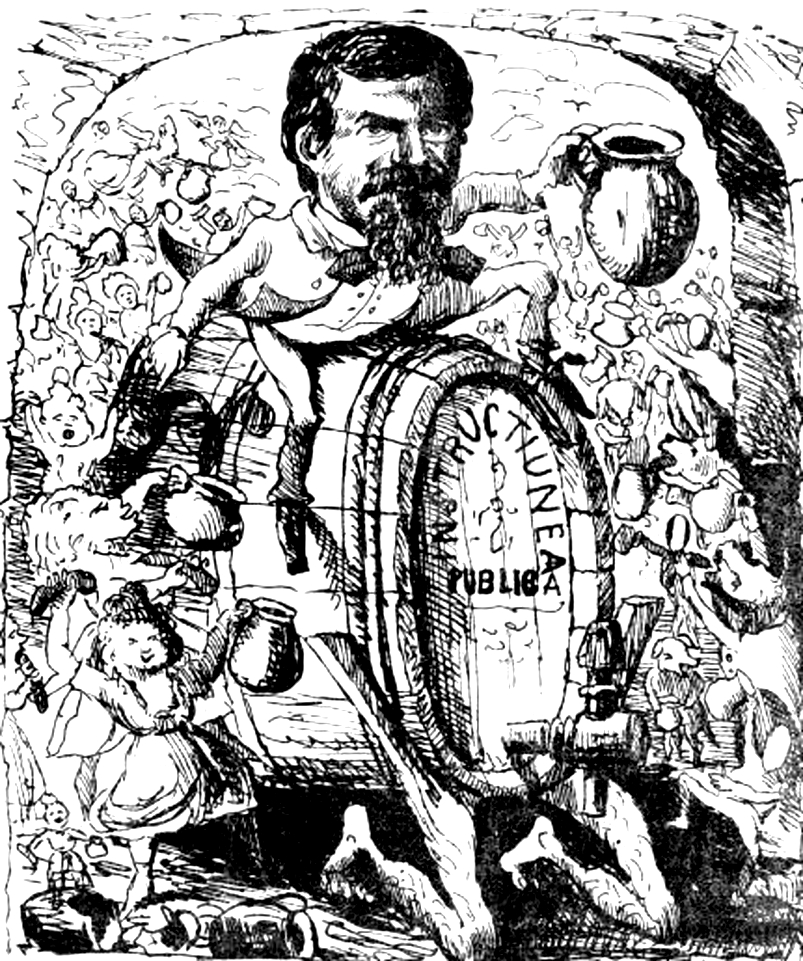
Cartoon in Ghimpele, the liberal magazine, depicting Titu Maiorescu and the "new direction" at Junimea (November 1875). The barrel ridden by Maiorescu is marked Instrucțiunea publică ("Public Instruction"), in reference to his job as Education Minister

Călinescu finds the poem to be a "vigorous satire", its reference to "B. Florescu's 'oakum' brain [...] describing quite well a fibrous arrhythmic state". By 1880, the "homunculus" imagery was rehashed for the early draft of an ample poem, Scrisoarea II, part of which is specifically dedicated to ridiculing Eminescu's detractors. As noted by Perpessicius, Florescu, unlike Rosetti, was never mentioned in the more definitive satire, Scrisoarea III. This, he suggests, may be a sign of his relative insignificance among Eminescu's enemies.

=== "Free" course and 1875 incidents ===
Overall, Potra notes, Florescu was largely unemployed, and pushed to make his living by giving private lessons in French—his students included the two daughters of physician Constantin Istrati and the future dramatist Ioan Bacalbașa. "Turned proletarian", he and Rose-Henriette lived in rented rooms at Pasajul Roman. Maiorescu only allowed Florescu to teach an optional "free" course at the University of Bucharest Faculty of Letters. The lessons were a corpus of "critical modern history" (published as a textbook in 1875), discussing such topics as progressivism, the Ancien Régime, British constitutionalism, and German nationalism, as well as the genesis of Wallachian boyardom. They were also indirectly supervised from Paris by professor Henri Pigeonneau, who sent Florescu a bibliography. Although Florescu expressed his frustration over lacking oratorical skills, the lectures made him very popular with Bucharesters.

Florescu's radicalism also brought him into contact with Hristo Botev, instigator of the Bulgarian National Revival, whom Florescu met in Bucharest and perhaps acquainted with the works of Bălcescu. Some controversy did occur locally when Florescu expressed his democratic beliefs in his university lectures, describing boyardom as a bane and congratulating his own family for giving up on privilege. His early work as a polemicist includes two volumes of Etiam contra omnes ("Even against All"), published alongside the brochure Una suta de adevĕrurĭ ("A Hundred Truths"). The latter comprised aphorisms tinged by anti-Junimism, originally appearing in the daily Telegraphul de Bucurescĭ, where he also published essays discussing Étienne de La Boétie's Discourse on Voluntary Servitude.

He kept a grudge against Maiorescu, and, in 1875 letters for Apărătorul Legeĭ newspaper, accused others, notably Cezar Bolliac, of behaving "like Maiorescu". Despite this, in 1877 Florescu was theater chronicler at the Junimea daily, România Liberă. His journalism was by then prolific, with articles also taken up in Columna lui Traian and Românul, and also in liberal papers such as Albine și Viespi, Alegătorul, and Revista Contimporană. Some were encyclopedic overviews, with topics such as Pre-Columbian Mexico (1875) and the settlement of Iceland (1877); others were the first in a series of Studiĭ literare ("Studies in Literature") where he carried on with critiques of prosody. Another contribution was as a translator, where he made local literary history with Edgar Allan Poe's "Tell-Tale Heart" in 1875, followed in 1876 by "The Facts in the Case of M. Valdemar".

Also in 1875, Florescu involved himself in the dispute between Romania and Austria-Hungary, concerning the Duchy of Bukovina—Romanian-inhabited, but taken by the Austrian Empire following the rearrangement of 1775. His work, published as a brochure co-authored by Vasile Maniu, accused the Austrians of double-dealing and fraud perpetrated against Moldavia and the Ottomans. Such ideas endeared him to the Romanian nationalists in Transylvania, which was also under Austro-Hungarian rule. In that region, Florescu's work was displayed as an important contribution in Orientul Latin, the nationalist, Pan-Latinist, anti-Junimist review of Ioan Alexandru Lapedatu. Florescu also involved himself in the dispute over Jewish emancipation: with his school friend Damé, he translated into French Hasdeu's Histoire de la tolérance religieuse en Roumanie ("History of Religious Tolerance in Romania").

In April 1875, with help from liberal agitators, Florescu seized the opportunity to lecture on Bukovina at the Romanian Atheneum. The Catargiu government forbade it and threatened him with arrest, though he eventually found an open venue at Suhr Circus, between Calea Victoriei and Lipscani. Despite his attested incompetence in public speaking, this event attracted a crowd comprising, in some reports, as many as 6,000 nationalists. Shortly after the Suhr Circus incident, Romanian liberal groups formed the National Liberal Party, which became focused on regaining power. For three weeks in April 1876, Florescu's cousin was the conservative Prime Minister of a mainly soldiers' cabinet. Outmaneuvered by the opposition, it fell and was replaced with a National Liberal government, headed by Manolache Costache Epureanu—himself replaced after the June election with Ion Brătianu, supported by the party's radical, or "Red", majority.

=== Literatorul ===
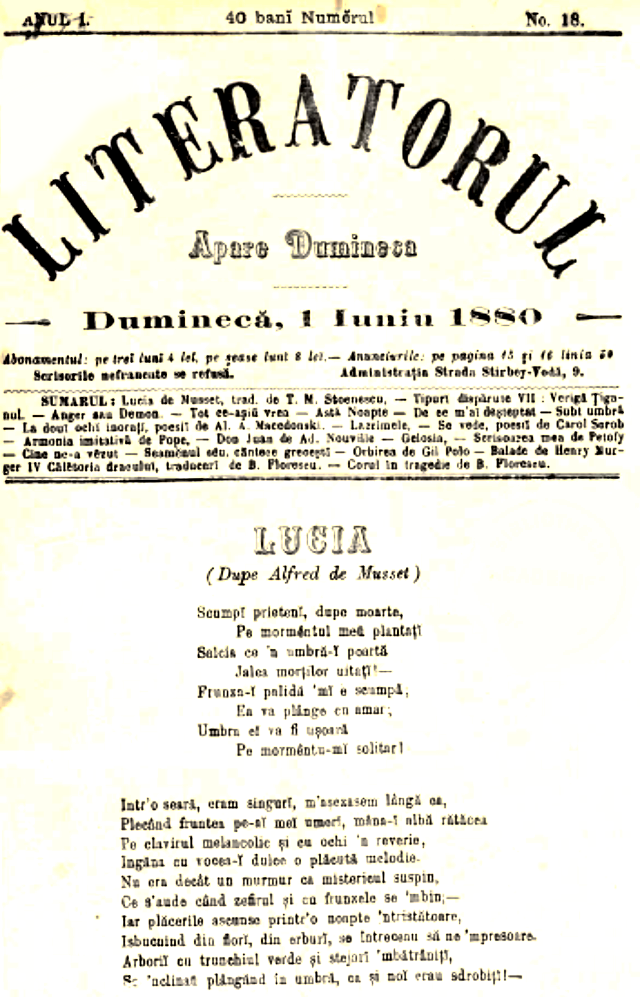
Literatorul of June 1, 1880, featuring Floescu's essay on the Greek chorus and translations from Henri Murger, alongside poetry by Macedonski, Th. M. Stoenescu, and Carol Scrob

During this episode of liberal triumph an intrigue, Florescu befriended the liberal poet Alexandru Macedonski, who sympathized with him in his conflict with Maiorescu. Macedonski wrote a poem denouncing Maiorescu's "scholarly tribe" and Florescu's 1874 sacking. Between March and June, Florescu published his own newspaper, the republican and anti-conservative Stindardul ("The Flag"), alongside Macedonski and dramatist Pantazi Ghica; however, Macedonski soon quit the enterprise. As a "Red", Florescu tried but failed to present himself as a candidate in Ilfov County: in primaries, his colleagues preferred Eugeniu Stătescu over him; in June 1876, he withdrew from Stindardul, declaring himself exhausted by the elections and by his regular work, the "five hours of daily tutoring". As noted by memoirist Constantin Bacalbașa, both Florescu and Macedonski had political ambitions and were very popular in liberal circles, but they were also "transient heroes, the sort that go down with their ephemeral wave."

In July 1876, minister Gheorghe Chițu ruled Florescu's 1873 appointment valid, but only assigned him to a history-and-French teacher's position at Saint Sava High School. According to the satirical gazette Ghimpele, Florescu, "erstwhile a communist, yesterday a liberal", taught his pupils extravagant and inaccurate lessons in history. It also alleged that he skipped classes in order to promote the magazine Nuvelistul, on which he also worked as a writer. In 1877–1878, the Romanian War of Independence (or more specifically, Romania's contribution to the Russo-Turkish War) opened the way for the country's evolution into a Kingdom of Romania (1880). Although independence occurred under a National Liberal mandate, Bonifaciu's cousin is widely credited with having helped modernize the Romanian Land Forces and getting them battle-ready. Bonifaciu also contributed as a writer and humanitarian. In August 1877, he covered the troops' inspection for the newspaper Războiul, announcing that their bravery "defied death itself". His poetry collection Quelques vers specified that it collected money au profit des blessés ("to help the wounded").

Meanwhile, Florescu saw himself as fit to occupy the vacated French-language chair at Bucharest University. However, this was converted into a Romance studies chair by government order, then assigned to Gian Luigi Frollo—the enduring perception was that Brătianu was clamping down on French influence, for fear of upsetting Germany. Florescu tried but failed to obtain a professorship in psychology and aesthetics at Bucharest University, and narrowly lost the race for the Romance chair. From January 1880, with Macedonski and Th. M. Stoenescu, Florescu edited a cultural review, Literatorul, where he published notes on the Franco-Prussian War and his new prose poetry, the "watercolors" and "sanguines". The embryo of a local Symbolist movement, Literatorul soon became noted for its prolonged polemic with Eminescu, which was carried by both Macedonski and Florescu. The latter also censured Macedonski's estranged friend, Duiliu Zamfirescu, who defected to Junimea. When he later alleged that this was for material gain, Zamfirescu simply dismissed him as a zevzec ("nitwit").

Florescu himself eventually withdrew from the enterprise after a mysterious quarrel with Macedonski, who then accused him, also in Literatorul, of having squandered public money with his teaching. However, according to scholar Șerban Cioculescu, Florescu and Stonescu, together with poet-actor Mircea Demetriade—all three "faint and subdued figures"—, remained the last Macedonski loyalists as the latter fell into disgrace. Similarly, critic Adrian Marino notes that, while Macedonski's program was "constructive, evolved and receptive of the most fecund modern orientations", its main adherents, Florescu included, were "insignificant [and] obscure". A Macedonskian disciple, Alexandru Obedenaru, reports that the two senior writers were still sitting at the same table in Terasa Otetelișanu during late 1883, when they were both assaulted by some of Eminescu's followers. Florescu was pummeled by the intruders (and also sprayed with carbonated water by Costache Câmpineanu, who was aiming a soda siphon at them, and missed).

Florescu's own monthly, Portofoliul Român ("The Romanian Portfolio"), appeared between March 1881 and June 1882, hosting poetry by Demetriade and Florescu's "watercolors", as well as his various historical essays—much praised by the Romanophile Frenchman Abdolonyme Ubicini. In a note published therein, he revealed that Portofoliul only existed because of Petru Grădișteanu, whose recent law on debt relief had spared Florescu from his creditors. This news was reviewed with amusement in Junimea's Convorbiri Literare, which remarked that literature "owes so much to Mr. Grădișteanu". The same magazine derided Florescu's attempt to summarize philosophically the history of Austria on five pages: "The bigger the country, the shorter its philosophy." Additionally, Florescu announced that he was working on a fragmentary treatise on the historiosophy of the Balkans, seen by him as a single cultural and racial space. His other contributions included a rhyming obituary to painter Ion Andreescu, taken up in Binele Public newspaper and then carved on Andreescu's tombstone.

=== Bohemian ===
In 1884, the Florescus moved out of Pasajul Roman and to a small house on Calea Victoriei, with Bonifaciu founding a literary serial, Biblioteca Omuluĭ de Gust ("The Library of Tasteful Men"), where he issued the collected poems of Alexandru Depărățeanu. The year also witnessed a release of his collected historical essays, as Memento de istorie universală sau Istoria în tablourĭ ("World History Memento or, History in Scenes"); his translation of Musset's play "Never Swear That You Be Not Forsworn"; and his critical edition of Count Buffon's Discours sur le style. In August of the following year, Românul had a row with the National Liberal Party, causing Florescu to side with the former. The core issue was again nationalism: Prime Minister Brătianu gave in to Austro-Hungarian demands, and expelled a group of Transylvanians, including Nicolae Ciurcu, publisher of L'Indépendance Roumaine. When Românul protested and was raided by police, Florescu showed up to express solidarity, one of several National Liberals to do so—the others were Grădișteanu, Dimitrie Gianni, and George D. Pallade. In 1886, his essay on the 1848 revolution was taken up by the same L'Indépendance Roumaine.

By then, the historian lived a bohemian life, and was a regular at Fialcovsky Coffeehouse, where he appeared "jocular and always absentminded", or even: "the most absentminded man the world has ever known." According to the recollections of Mariu Theodorian-Carada, although "Boniface Florescu" and Demetriade made efforts to keep it alive, by 1886 "Fialkovsky was dwindling". Potra notes that Florescu was memorable as a Bucharest "type", "with his quite disheveled appearance, his paddling, slow and measured stride, and above all with his way of life". Reportedly, he always wore just one galosh, or sometimes one of his wife's boots, and his suits were covered in ink blots. Obedenaru describes him as the Romanian answer to an "Assyrian mage", who looked like he had never seen a barber, and whose "black frock was always stuffed with books and manuscripts." Gheorghe Gh. Longinescu, who was schooled at Saint Sava, recalls that his teacher had an unusual, crooked, stride, which matched his handwriting. An unnamed Saint Sava alumnus recalled in 1926: "Just about every day, he would walk the streets reading from a newspaper or a book, and, since he was shortsighted, he kept [it] very close to his eyes, and so he bumped into streetlights or street corners, after which he would present his excuses."

Carol, by then King of Romania, allegedly kept informed about Florescu's lifestyle, and called him out as Romania's Rumpelkammer ("junkroom"). The writer Maica Smara, who shared a home with Bonifaciu, Henriette-Rose, and sculptor Ion Georgescu in the 1880s, recalls that they "never once opened a window", and notes: "hoopoes did better housecleaning than them." Physician Constantin Dimitrescu-Severeanu, who visited his home, records that both Florescu slept on a pile of hay, and that Bonifaciu looked like "he never washed his face more than thrice a year." Florescu was a heavy drinker and smoker, and, according to another one-time student, Constantin Kirițescu, only seemed at ease in coffeehouses and bars; he despised Saint Sava and, with time, only showed up for that work because it paid a salary. A rumor later recorded by poet Tudor Arghezi has it that he let all his students pass the final exams if they bought one of his books—Florescu himself handed them their copies, after rummaging through a coffer that also included "his and his wife's dirty linen", as well as "Swiss-cheese rind". According to Dr. Severeanu, he borrowed money from both friends and students, promising that they were for him to write a new book. Longinescu additionally claims that Florescu was "unusually cultured, but lacked common sense", and so the victim of "countless student pranks". Among the students who remained loyal to Florescu was the poet Iuliu Cezar Săvescu, who, in 1886, also became a member of Macedonski's circle.

While his picturesque demeanor was laughed at, Florescu's erudition was acclaimed, in particular concerning his passionate Saint Sava lessons about 18th-century French literature, which was regarded as his main field of expertise. Novelist Gala Galaction, who studied in a parallel class, under Tănase Tănăsescu, recalled in 1930 that Florescu was dismissive toward his colleagues, but also that he had reason be proud: "haughty, daydreaming, with something missing upstairs, [he was] still one great scholar". The courses were published in several installments, from 1887 to 1893, followed by the book edition of Studiĭ literare. In April 1888, Macedonski and Florescu took over management of România Literară review from D. Teleor; it survived until 1889. Also in 1889, Florescu translated Catulle Mendès' Imagerie parisienne, adding his own "Romanian Sanguines", and returned to the University of Bucharest with another "free" course, this time on French literature. By then, he had joined several members of the Literatorul school who were migrating toward Revista Nouă, put out by Hasdeu and featuring authors disliked by Macedonski. Interested in spiritism, from about 1890 Florescu also attended Hasdeu's séances, alongside Bishop Ghenadie, George Ionescu-Gion, and Ioan S. Nenițescu; Theodor Speranția acted as medium.

In 1892, he produced a volume of his collected poetry, as Ritmurĭ și rime ("Rhythms and Rhymes"). Its theoretical notes on prosody relaunched the attack on Eminescu, depicting him and the younger Alexandru Vlahuță as "enemies of rhythm and rhyme"; of the latter two, he favored rhythm, and translated a fragment from Victor Hugo in blank verse, to prove his point. The book also featured his renditions of poems by: Henri Auguste Barbier, Mellin de Saint-Gelais, Charles Baudelaire, Pierre de Ronsard, Alfred de Musset, Clément Marot, François Rabelais, Isaac de Benserade, Paul Scarron, Alexandre Soutzo, Ponce Lebrun, and Charles Rivière Dufresny. His work of the period also covered selections from other classics and moderns of French literature: Molière, Voltaire, Rodolphe Töpffer, Alexandre Dumas, Edgar Quinet, George Sand, Henri Murger, Paul Armand Silvestre, Théodore de Banville, and José-Maria de Heredia; more exotically, he also rendered into Romanian works by Walter Scott and Fernán Caballero, as well as samples of Malagasy and Indian poetry. Also publishing in Giurgiu an anthology of 17th-century poetry in French, he moved house closer to Saint Sava in 1891, at a new address on Soarelui Street, which also became the editorial offices of his new gazette. Called Dumineca ("The Sunday"), and published to February 1891, it was co-edited by Demetriade and Săvescu, and possibly managed by the latter.

=== 1890s irredentism ===
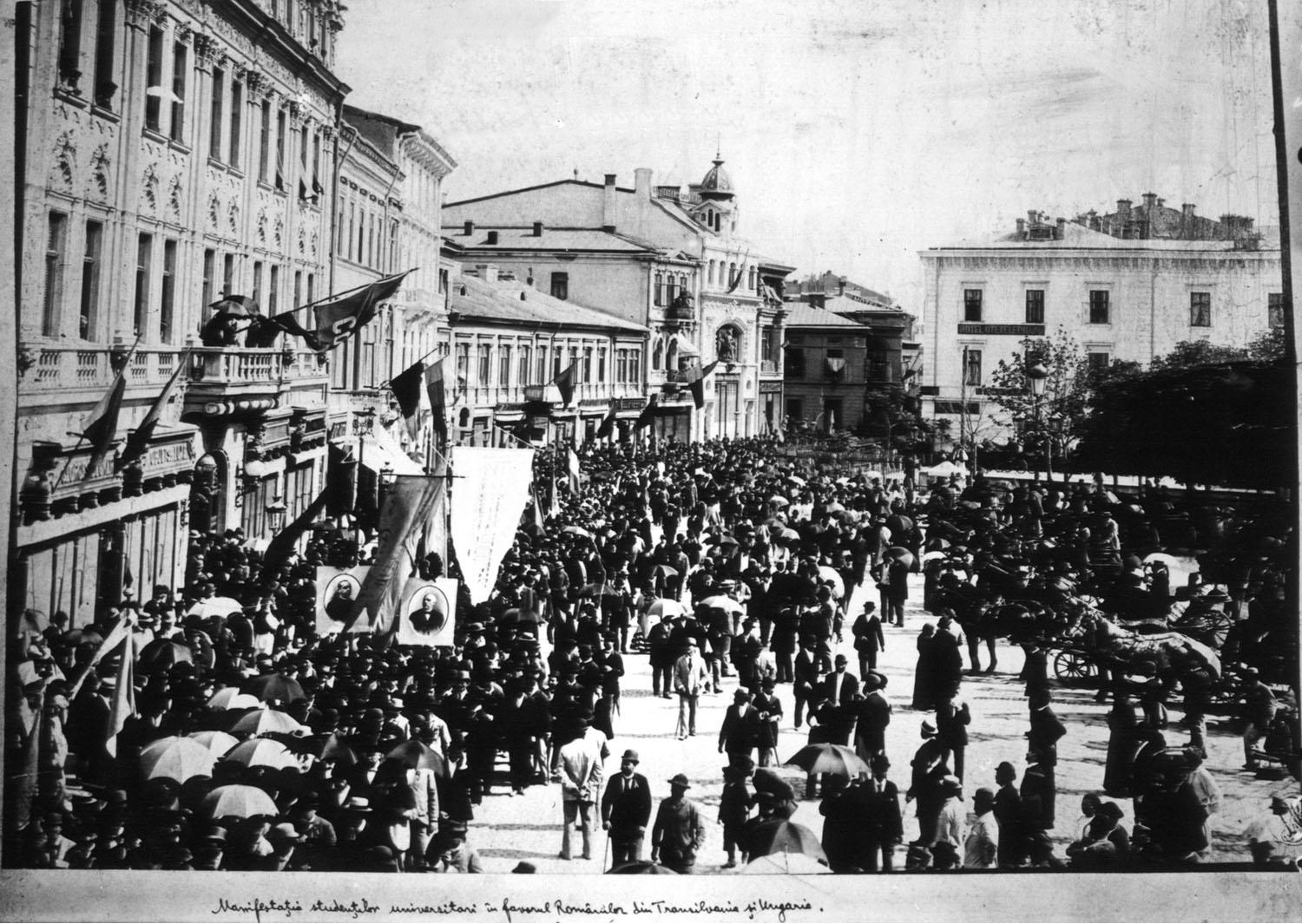
University of Bucharest students rallying in support of the Transylvanian Memorandum, 1892 photograph

A while after, Florescu's cousin, a prominent figure in the Liberal Conservative Party, briefly served as Prime Minister. Reportedly, Bonifaciu had hopes that Ioan Emanoil would reestablish the Bucharest French-language chair and assign him to it, but the relevant minister, G. Dem. Teodorescu, vetoed any such move. The premier was eventually sidelined from within the party by Catargiu, and lost a vote of no confidence, ushering in the February 1892 elections; he died in Paris in May 1893. Around that time, Bonifaciu had begun writing a biography of his father, in French; unpublished, it was later preserved by the Bălcescu Memorial Museum. With Demetriade, he became a regular contributor to Săvescu's own literary magazine, launched in 1893 as Liga Literară. Florescu was also a regular at Grigore Tocilescu's scientific journal, Revista pentru Istorie, Arheologie și Filologie. Tocilescu, his cousin thrice removed, allowed him to publish his notes on Bălcescu's complex mediation between the Hungarians and Romanians of Transylvania.

His own hard-line stance on the Transylvanian issue, expressed during the Transylvanian Memorandum incident of 1892, alienated him further from both dominant parties. By November 1893, he was editing a newspaper called Irredenta Română ("The Romanian Irredenta"), his contribution there derided by the National Liberal Dimitrie Sturdza. Sturdza argued that Florescu's goal of annexing Transylvania to the Romanian kingdom was unrealistic; he also declared that such radicalism was only serving Romania's enemies, with Florescu and his colleagues "either sold out or very incompetent and stupid." Joining the nonpartisan Cultural League for the Unity of All Romanians, Florescu was a direct contributor to its irredentist propaganda, working alongside the Italian sympathizer Roberto Fava. He also helped the young nationalist liberal, Take Ionescu, polishing his letters of protest against Austria-Hungary, written in French. As Ionescu recalled decades later: "Bonifaciu was a veritable savant, but had endured the unrepentant bohemian. He only worked when we pressed him to, with us looking over his shoulder."

During this stage of his life, Florescu became close friends with Georges Bibesco, French-speaking son of Prince Gheorghe Bibescu (whom his father and uncles had deposed in 1848). He translated Bibesco's defensive biography of his father, which ran at over 1200 pages in the printed edition of 1893–1894. As he noted in a dedication to Bibesco, he considered him a friend through their shared Francophilia, but nonetheless a political adversary. Bibesco then enlisted Florescu's services in clearing Prince Gheorghe of the allegations that he intended to concede all of Wallachia's mining industry to Russian venture capitalists. Florescu also worked with Theodor Assan and A. Dobrovici on a history of the United Principalities, published as Unirea Română ("The Romanian Unification"), and translated Bibesco's tract on the history of Wallachia and Moldavia under Regulamentul Organic.

Also in 1894, Florescu was an unsuccessful candidate for the vacated chair of medieval and modern history at Bucharest University—a position ultimately taken up by Nicolae Iorga in 1895. According to historian Lucian Nastasă, his "permanent failure" to obtain academic credentials had an explanation "as plain as they get: his attitude was openly and actively anti-Junimist." Reflecting back on the period in 1939, Iorga himself noted: "Shame that in this literary world of ours, guided by groups and interests, that poor man never heard a good word for that consuming labor of his and for his true talent, inherited from his father."

=== Final activities ===
Florescu gathered his Literatorul pieces as Aquarele și poeziĭ în proză ("Watercolors and Prose Poems"), with contributions by Demetriade and a C. Drăgulinescu, and with samples from Murger. His work for 1894 additionally included the first volume of a French–Romanian dictionary (comprising 6 volumes in all), followed in 1895 by an overview of French lyrical poetry "between the 10th and 20th [sic] centuries". In his final years, Florescu made one more attempt at founding a review—the 1894 weekly Dacia Viitoare ("Future Dacia")—and contributed an overview of the Horea–Cloșca rebellion to the Symbolist journal Revista Orientală. Together with I. S. Spartali, he translated one of Gustave Flaubert's lesser known works, Le Candidat, which was published by România Literară in 1897.

According to Arghezi, Florescu was mainly focused on setting up his own printing press, and bought himself samples of movable type; beset by financial troubles, he would then sell his letters by the pound, asking: "'Would anyone like to buy the letter A or the letter P?' They all laughed at him." He eventually resigned from Saint Sava, but continued to teach history and French at Mihai Viteazul High School, at the military high school, and at the Saint Nephon seminary. His late experiments in wisdom poetry appeared in the Transylvanian Vatra. For a while director of a new magazine, Țara Literară ("The Literary Country"), he was also a contributor to Ion Livescu's Revista Theatrelor, aimed at the community of actors and theater aficionados. Livescu saw him as one of the great critics in the field, equal to Ionescu-Gion and Grigore Ventura. In 1896, his and Demetriade's informal literary circle at Fialcovsky was joined by the anarchist and art promoter Alexandru Bogdan-Pitești. That year, Săvescu and Florescu began translating from a history of Albanian literature (in Italian, by Alberto Straticò). By then, Florescu had published over 200 books, comprising his own works alongside translations, and had had his own verse anthologized by poet Radu D. Rosetti (in Cartea Dragosteĭ, 1896).

Before August 1899, Florescu's work was hampered by an illness, later diagnosed as ventricular hypertrophy; he was living with his family in a small house on Speranței Street, north of Colțea Hospital. Luxița Florescu died in October of that year, aged 83, and Bonifaciu only two months later, on December 18. Demetriade unexpectedly dropped by on a visit just after his friend's death, recalling: "he had woken up more joyful than ever. Always one to enjoy a pun, he asked his wife, whose name was Rose, to hand him a rose that had been left in some glass. Just after Madam Florescu handed him that flower, the soul of this man, always a poet, went out with the perfume of the rose." A brief obituary in Literatorul credited him as someone "illustrious but unhappy", who "stood up to the intellectual degeneracy into which our country was continuously pushed." He was buried in the family crypt at Țigănești Monastery, next to his mother, with a funeral ceremony attended by the Bucharest aristocracy and the Saint Sava students. The grave has since been lost during extensive repair work on the monastery grounds.

== Literary work ==
George Călinescu saw Florescu as a characteristic product of the Lycée Louis-le-Grand, his didactic art "decent" but "convoluted and timid, overwhelmed by ideas of classicism". His lyrical poetry respects all the criteria that he wanted to impose on Eminescu; nonetheless, critics argue, it is not ungraceful, nor devoid of sentiment. However, according to Potra, his 1883 epitaph for Ion Andreescu is "very dull, in pointless verses which tell us nothing about the value of our great painter." As seen by comparatist Marin Bucur, Florescu's work in verse was already culturally irrelevant by 1875. As a literary innovator directly inspired by Catulle Mendès, Florescu tied to popularize a genre prose poetry "from life", the so-called "watercolors" or "sanguines". According to Adrian Marino, these were among the more adequate and modern samples of Literatorul prose—alongside those by Săvescu, Constantin Cantilli, and D. Teleor; the rest were "tendentious, abstract", and "dependent" on Macedonski's verdicts. Received with sarcasm by other critics, they include fragments about blind and insane children, or about children sleeping in each other's arms, and, as comparatist Mihai Zamfir argues, were "experiments [...] pushed into oblivion" by the more mature Symbolist prose poetry of Ștefan Petică (ca. 1900).

Florescu's epistolary novel, Etiam contra omnes, depicts the worldview of "Recaredo", a Peruvian spiritist and Pan-Latinist intellectual. It impressed a young Take Ionescu, who found Recaredo to be the perfect human, and his racial ideology a symbol of Romania's own discords with her various neighbors. As Florescu informed his readers, these were "pages written at a time when only literature was my comfort"—words expressing, again, his enmity for Junimea. The novel, Ionescu believed, had a mission to "instill Romanianism", and also to cultivate solidarity between Romanians and Greeks. Florescu also earned some attention as a literary essayist, popularizer, and critic—much inspired by four scholars, whom he deemed the elite of French literature: Abel-François Villemain, Sainte-Beuve, Hippolyte Taine, and Emile Hennequin. Călinescu stresses that Florescu's opening lesson of 1873 was "a lamentable rigmarole that addressed the issue of historical objectivity". Later tracts were "wordy, without proper ranking of values". According to Bucur, Florescu was an "amateur", "textbook cultivated", "a cultural journalist enthusiastic about beauty and culture, taking pains not to fatigue a public that cannot sustain the effort." According to Iorga, his exposition was "always lively, not without fortunate characterizations"—such as when Florescu depicted Danton as a "poor man's Mirabeau". Overall, however, Iorga referred to Florescu as a "bizarre" or "weird" author. Similarly, the anti-Symbolist Ilarie Chendi viewed Florescu as "cultured, but ill-regulated".

Although marginally supportive of Symbolism, Florescu was noticeably unimpressed by its herald Baudelaire, and, Bucur writes, "understood nothing from Mallarmé and Verlaine". Chendi saw Florescu as the instigator of Romania's Decadent movement, which revolved around a cult for Baudelaire; however, he believed that Florescu's particular contribution was reviving another cult, that of romantic poets: Ion Heliade Rădulescu, Dimitrie Bolintineanu, and Alexandru Depărățeanu, whom Florescu rated "above Eminescu". In 1878, he also described a non-Symbolist poet, Ronetti Roman, as a master, Romania's answer to Musset and Heinrich Heine. Some reviewers attribute Macedonski's affection for Florescu to the latter's "attachment to French culture" or, more precisely, to Macedonski's snobbery: "A writer turned proletarian and with relations all across the world, who descended from Michael the Brave, from N. Bălcescu, and from some of the leading princely families, with relatives in Portugal, England and India—that catered to Macedonski's preferences."

== Legacy ==
Florescu was survived by both his wife and his son. In 1900, Henriette-Rose took a small pension from the state, awarded to her by a review committee which included Costache Bălcescu. She lived for 28 more years, to January 1928. Ion, a general in the Romanian Land Forces, married in February 1910 Elena Kalinderu, a relative of agriculturist and art collector Ioan Kalinderu. In early 1927, he was serving as a general secretary in the Ministry of War, and tasked with purchasing weapons in the Kingdom of Italy. This activity was scrutinized by a fellow general, Gheorghe Cantacuzino-Grănicerul, who noted it as controversial; the two men dueled over these allegations. According to Cantacuzino and his witnesses, he was first wounded, and then disgraced when he attempted an underhand stab at his adversary. Florescu Jr had two sons of his own. One of them, Mircea Ioan, was born in 1912. He died in July 1927, after engaging in reckless driving through Văcărești. The general's other child was judge Ion "Nelu" Florescu, who emigrated to Brazil and was still alive in 1941.

Bonifaciu Florescu's work and family history gained more exposure after the August 1944 coup and during early Romanian communism, when left-wing ideologies turned Bălcescu into their hero. At the time, Potra notes, the Florescus came to accept Bonifaciu's paternity, published secret notes and rare photographs, and even helped Camil Petrescu write his romanticized biography of the revolutionary. In the 1950s, Soviet historiography proposed that Florescu was secretly a Communard, and that he supported Sergey Nechayev, the Russian revolutionist, providing him with his own passport. The claim was reviewed with skepticism by the Romanian scholar Georges Haupt, who noted that "Florescu" was actually a certain N. F. Melediu. As argued in the 1980s by Potra, the real Florescu had been causally forgotten, despite being both Bălcescu's heir and, on his own, "a distinguished scholar, a true encyclopédiste."

== Published books ==
- Etiam contra omnes (2 vols.), Bucharest, 1875
- Una suta de adevĕrurĭ, Bucharest, 1875
- Cursu facultativu de istoria moderna critica, Bucharest, 1875
- Răpirea Bucovineĭ (with Vasile Maniu), Bucharest, 1875
- Quelques vers au profit des blessés, Bucharest, 1877
- Memento de istorie universală sau Istoria în tablourĭ, Bucharest, 1883
- Curs metodic de limba francĭuzèscă, Bucharest, 1887
- Sanguine (translated from Catulle Mendès and followed by Sanguine românești), Bucharest, 1889
- Morceaux choisis, XVII-e siècle. Poésie, Giurgiu, 1889
- Cours de littérature française (2 vols.), Bucharest, 1890
- Ritmurĭ și rime, Bucharest, 1892
- Studiĭ literare (2 vols.), Bucharest, 1892–1893
- Aquarele și poeziĭ în proză, Bucharest, 1894
- Dicționar franceso–român (6 vols.), Bucharest, 1894
- Unirea Română (with Theodor Assan and A. Dobrovici), Bucharest, 1894
- La poésie lyrique française du X-ème au XX-ème siècle. I: Du X-ème au XIX-ème siècle, Bucharest, 1895
