= Săvescu =

Săvescu is a Romanian surname. Notable people with the surname include:

- Iuliu Cezar Săvescu (1866–1903), Romanian poet
- Napoleon Săvescu (fl. early 21st century), Romanian-American physician

== See also ==
- Săvescu River
