= Alexandru Depărățeanu =

Alexandru Depărățeanu (February 25, 1834–January 9, 1865) was a Wallachian, later Romanian poet and playwright.

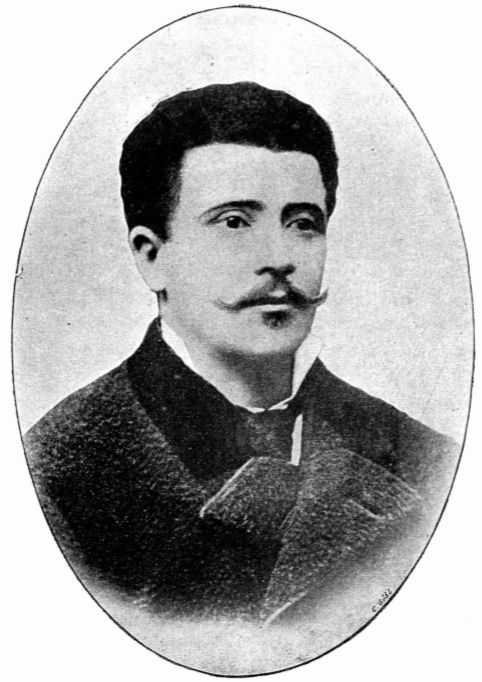
Alexandru Depărățeanu was a Romanian poet, politician and playwright.

== Biography ==
Born in Roșiorii de Vede, his parents were Petru Depărățeanu and his wife Elisabeta (née Altanlâu). He studied in his native town and at Bucharest's Saint Sava College, after which he went to the University of Paris from 1856 to 1858, without earning a degree. From 1860 to 1865, Depărățeanu was deputy prefect of Teleorman and Târgului plăși, and in 1864 was a deputy to the Legislative Chamber.

Depărățeanu's contributions appeared in Buciumul, Seculul and Naționalul. Two books of his poetry were published in 1861: Ciocoii vechi și ciocoii noi and Doruri și amoruri. These were followed by his 1864 historical drama Grigorie Vodă – domnul Moldovei. Among the first translators from Spanish to Romanian, he worked with a few romancero texts, finding convincing equivalent terms. His poetry bears all the marks of a transitional era and suffers from the lexical uncertainties of a language under the impact of French influence. Nevertheless, pre-Eminescian and even pre-Symbolist tones are dimly perceptible. As a playwright (aside from the 1864 work, he wrote a comedy in 1852, Don Gulică sau pantofiorii miraculoși, that was published posthumously), he shows sufficient talent for creating scenes, even managing beautiful sequences in the Romance drama style. These are comparable to the achievements of Bogdan Petriceicu Hasdeu and Vasile Alecsandri.
