= Iuliu Cezar Săvescu =

Romanian poet

Iuliu Cezar Săvescu (September 22, 1866 – March 9, 1903) was a Romanian poet.

== Biography ==
Born in Brăila to the civil servant Eulampiu Săvescu and his wife Fania, he attended primary school and the first years of high school in his native city. He then continued his studies at Bucharest's Saint Sava High School, where his teacher Bonifaciu Florescu introduced him to Alexandru Macedonski's circle. Thanks to the latter's efforts, he secured a post as proofreader at Monitorul Oficial. He led an increasingly dissolute Bohemian lifestyle. It is not known if and when he completed high school; according to some sources, he may have audited classes at the University of Bucharest's literature faculty, without graduating. It is also unknown when he made his debut; this may have taken place in 1888 in Peleșul magazine, with the poem "Pe când cerul vieței mele". He was an editor at Duminica magazine in 1890, and also published in Liga literară (among other writings, he submitted translations of Edgar Allan Poe), Literatorul, Convorbiri literare, Tribuna familiei, Ilustrațiunea română, Fântâna Blanduziei, Revista orientală, Foaia pentru toți, Românul and Liberalul.

A Symbolist, he collected part of his verses into a modest little book, self-published in a tiny print run, the 1901 Poezii. In 1926, Nicolae Davidescu prefaced and published Poezii. Volum unic. The latter also included part of Săvescu's poetic output in the 1943 anthology Din poezia noastră parnasiană, which revived him in critical attention. He also wrote a few fantasy prose works, as well as short essays and articles. He translated Ovid, a fragment of Dante Alighieri's Inferno, Giosuè Carducci and Poe (including "The Raven"). He was familiar with classic Albanian literature, and translated Giuseppe Schirò's prose poem Mili e Haidhia. In Liga literară in 1895, he published an unfinished free translation of Sophocles' Antigone.
