= Patriarch Parthenius of Constantinople =

Patriarch Parthenius of Constantinople may refer to:

- Parthenius I of Constantinople, Ecumenical Patriarch of Constantinople in 1639–1644
- Parthenius II of Constantinople, Ecumenical Patriarch of Constantinople in 1644–1646 and 1648–1651
- Parthenius III of Constantinople, Ecumenical Patriarch of Constantinople in 1656–1657
- Parthenius IV of Constantinople, Ecumenical Patriarch of Constantinople in 1657–1662, 1665–1667, 1671, 1675–1676, and 1684–1685
