= Cyril of Constantinople (disambiguation) =

Cyril of Constantinople was the legendary founder of the Carmelite Order.

Cyril of Constantinople may also refer to:

- Cyril Lucaris (d. 1638), Ecumenical Patriarch of Constantinople
- Cyril II of Constantinople (d. 1640), Ecumenical Patriarch
- Cyril III of Constantinople (d. 1654), Ecumenical Patriarch
- Cyril IV of Constantinople (d. 1728), Ecumenical Patriarch
- Cyril V of Constantinople (d. 1775), Ecumenical Patriarch
- Cyril VI of Constantinople (d. 1821), Ecumenical Patriarch
- Cyril VII of Constantinople (d. 1872), Ecumenical Patriarch
