= Patriarch Parthenius =

Patriarch Parthenius may refer to:

- Parthenius I of Constantinople, Ecumenical Patriarch of Constantinople in 1639–1644
- Parthenius I of Alexandria, Greek Patriarch of Alexandria in 1678–1688
- Parthenius II of Constantinople, Ecumenical Patriarch of Constantinople in 1644–1646 and 1648–1651
- Parthenius II of Alexandria, Greek Patriarch of Alexandria in 1788–1805
- Parthenius III of Constantinople, Ecumenical Patriarch of Constantinople in 1656–1657
- Parthenius III of Alexandria, Greek Orthodox Patriarch of Alexandria in 1987–1996
- Parthenius IV of Constantinople, Ecumenical Patriarch of Constantinople in 1657–1659, 1665–1667, 1671, 1675–1676 and 1684–1685
