= Patriarch Cyril III =

Patriarch Cyril III may refer to:

- Pope Cyril III of Alexandria, Pope of Alexandria & Patriarch of the See of St. Mark in 1235–1243
- Cyril III of Alexandria, Greek Patriarch of Alexandria in 1601–20
- Cyril III of Constantinople, Ecumenical Patriarch in 1652 and 1654
