= Patriarch Paisius of Constantinople =

Patriarch Paisius of Constantinople may refer to:

- Paisius I of Constantinople, Ecumenical Patriarch of Constantinople in 1652–1653
- Paisius II of Constantinople, Ecumenical Patriarch of Constantinople for four times in the 18th century
