= Saint Sava National College =

High school in Bucharest, Romania

- Colegiul Național Sfântul Sava
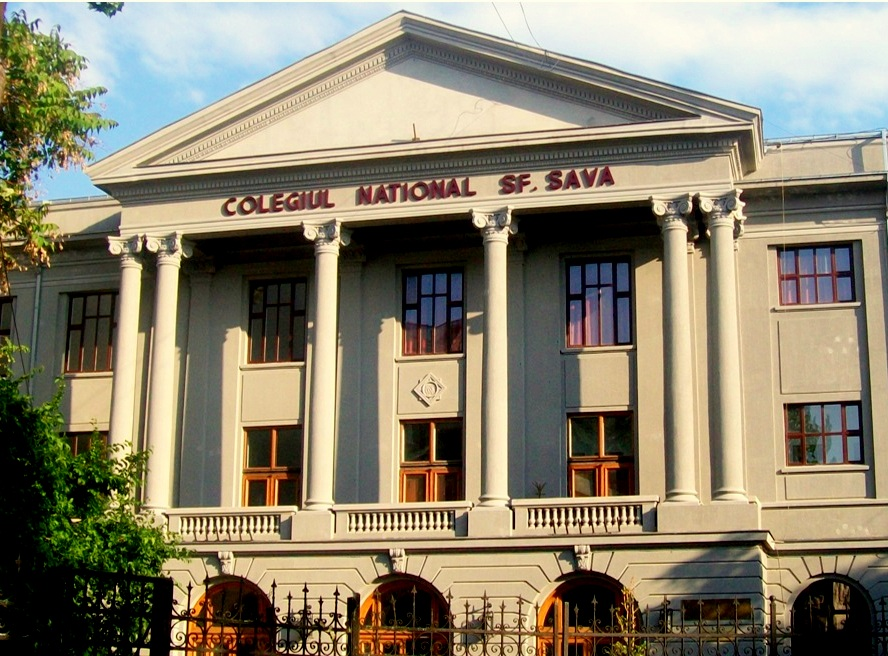

Location
- Strada General H. M. Berthelot no. 23; Bucharest, Sector 1, 010168; Romania; 44°26′27.6″N 26°05′28″E

Information
- Type: Public High School
- Established: 1864
- Status: Open
- Grades: 9 to 12
- Gender: Coeducational
- Age range: 14–19
- Enrolment: c. 1000
- Average class size: 30
- Language: Romanian
- Hours in school day: 5–7
- Campus type: Urban
- Nickname: CNSS
- Website: licsfsava.ro

The Saint Sava National College (Romanian: Colegiul Național Sfântul Sava), Bucharest, named after Sabbas the Sanctified, is the oldest and one of the most prestigious high schools in Romania. It was founded in 1694, under the name of the Royal Academy of Bucharest.

The College is the direct descendant of the Princely Academy of Saint Sava, which was divided in 1864 by Prince Alexandru Ioan Cuza into the University of Bucharest and the present high school. During the Communist era, its name was changed to Nicolae Bălcescu High School.

The name of the College comes from the Monastery of Saint Sabbas the Sanctified in Bucharest, in which it was founded. To this day, it celebrates its birthday on 5 December.

== History ==
In the 17th century Saint Sava was actually an old monastery built in Bucharest's historic centre, in the proximity of today's University Square. It was in the rooms of this monastery that Romania's first higher education institution was set up. The founding of this college in the late 17th century was brought about by a strong European influence, mostly Italian, that encouraged the rise of the national spirit. This assertion of a national awareness had the firm support of many writers and historians of the age.

In Wallachia (Southern Romania), the most remarkable representative of this trend was Constantin Cantacuzino, a writer and a boyar, who had been educated in Padua, Italy. He was a widely−travelled aristocrat and adviser to Prince Șerban Cantacuzino. As Constantin Cantacuzino was determined to have a college similar to the Italian ones set up in Bucharest, his brother's coming to power in 1678 made it possible for him to achieve his goal. Saint Sava Princely Academy was therefore created by Wallachia's reigning Prince Şerban Cantacuzino and it was placed under the aegis of the Prince and of Dositheos II, Patriarch of Jerusalem. Cultural and religious allegiance accounted for the fact that tuition was carried on in modern Greek, a symbol of Byzantine civilization.

The first principal of the school was Sebastos Kyminitis, who had been educated in Constantinople. Saint Sava Academy thrived during the reign of Constantin Brâncoveanu's, who sketched out the curriculum and ensured the funds needed to run the school. A law given in 1707 demanded that "teachers should be understanding and principled; they should also have excellent reputation".

== Notable teachers and alumni ==
=== Teachers (includes teachers at the Princely Academy) ===
- Emanoil Bacaloglu
- Constantin Kirițescu
- Gheorghe Lazăr
- Constantin Lecca
- Titu Maiorescu
- Eftimie Murgu
- Constantin Noe
- Parteniy Pavlovich
- Eufrosin Poteca
- Ion Heliade Rădulescu

=== Alumni (includes alumni from the Princely Academy) ===
- Gheorghe Adamescu
- Dinu Adameșteanu
- Mihai Antonescu
- Constantin D. Aricescu
- Petre S. Aurelian
- Barbu Bălcescu
- Nicolae Bălcescu
- Constantin Banu
- Daniel Barbu
- Ilie Bărbulescu
- Ioan A. Bassarabescu
- Constantin Boerescu
- Vasile Boerescu
- Stefan Bogoridi
- Dan Botta
- Ioan Alexandru Brătescu-Voinești
- Ion I. C. Brătianu
- Vintilă Brătianu
- Silviu Brucan
- Emanoil Bucuța
- Gheorghe I. Cantacuzino
- Dumitru Caracostea
- Nicolae Cartojan
- Alexandru Claudian
- Henri Coandă
- Florin Constantiniu
- N. Crevedia
- Mihail Cruceanu
- Alexandru Depărățeanu
- Mihail Dragomirescu
- Vasile Drăguț
- Charles Drouhet
- Lazăr Edeleanu
- Constantin Fântâneru
- Ioan C. Filitti
- Nicolae Fleva
- Alexandru Emanoil Florescu
- Richard Franasovici
- Gala Galaction
- Dinu C. Giurescu
- Alexandru G. Golescu
- Grigore H. Grandea
- Spiru Haret
- Vintilă Horia
- Eugène Ionesco
- Take Ionescu
- Ernest Juvara
- Eli Lotar
- Alexandru Marghiloman
- Nicolae Marinescu
- Ioan Mire Melik
- King Michael I
- Ștefan Mihăileanu
- Nicolae Minovici
- Ștefan Minovici
- Radu Muntean
- Gheorghe Munteanu-Murgoci
- D. Nanu
- Adrian Năstase
- Horațiu Năstase
- Constantin I. Nicolaescu
- Alexandru Nicolau
- N. T. Orășanu
- Alexandru Orăscu
- Mihail Oromolu
- Vasile Păun
- Adrian Păunescu
- Parteniy Pavlovich
- Camil Petrescu
- Constantin Titel Petrescu
- Dragoș Protopopescu
- Nicolae Quintescu
- Neagu Rădulescu
- Francisc Rainer
- Ion Marin Sadoveanu
- Alexandru Sahia
- Barbu Solacolu
- Gabriel Spahiu
- Simion Stolnicu
- Paraskev Stoyanov
- Florin Teodor Tănăsescu
- Christian Tell
- Corneliu Vadim Tudor
- Zoe Verbiceanu
- Ion Vinea
- George Julian Zolnay
