= Joannicius II of Constantinople =

Four-time Ecumenical Patriarch of Constantinople from 1646 to 1656

- Ecumenical Patriarch of Constantinople
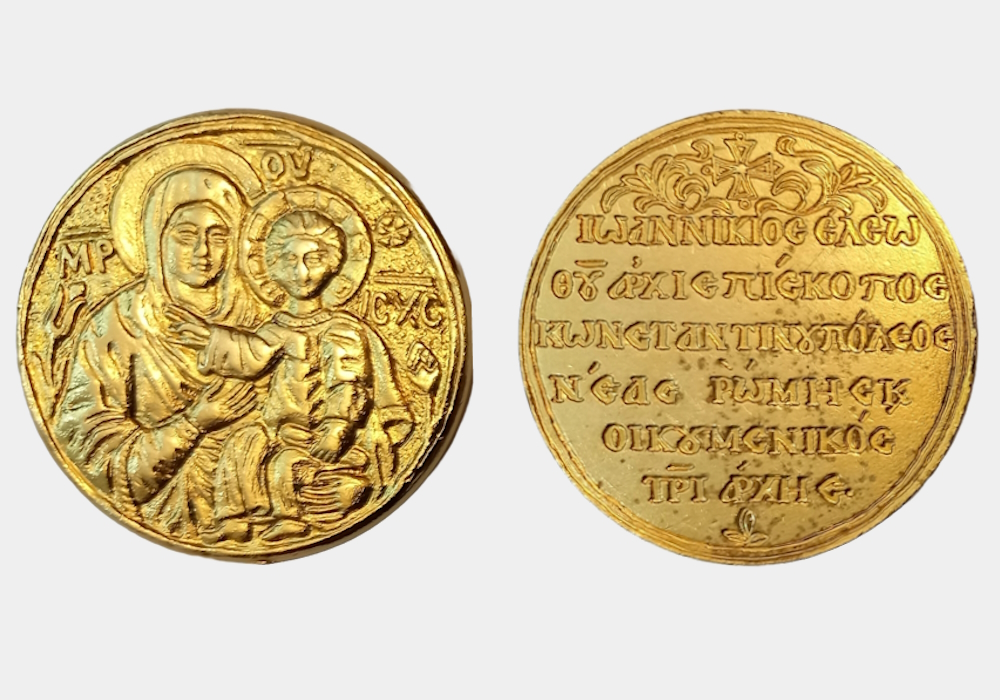
- Reproduction of the Patriarchal Seal of Joannicius II
- Church: Church of Constantinople
- In office: 16 November 1646 – 28 October 1648; June 1651 – June 1652; April 1653 – March 1654; March 1655 – July 1656
- Predecessor: Parthenius II of Constantinople; Parthenius II of Constantinople; Paisius I of Constantinople; Paisius I of Constantinople
- Successor: Parthenius II of Constantinople; Cyril III of Constantinople; Cyril III of Constantinople; Parthenius III of Constantinople
- Previous post: Metropolitan of Heraclea

Personal details
- Born: Lindos, Rhodes
- Died: 1659 or 1660 Greece
- Denomination: Eastern Orthodoxy

Joannicius II of Constantinople (Greek: Ἰωαννίκιος ὁ Λίνδιος; died 1659 or 1660) was Ecumenical Patriarch of Constantinople four times from 1646 to 1656.

== Life ==
Joannicius was a native of Lindos on the island of Rhodes. He was appointed Metropolitan of Ganos and Chora in 1624 by Patriarch Cyril I of Constantinople and in 1636 he became the Metropolitan of Heraclea. Supported by the Moldavian Voivode, Vasile Lupu, he was elected the first time to the Patriarchal Throne on 16 November 1646.

Throughout the 17th century, it was customary that the intrigues and quarrels into the Greek community and the Holy Synod caused rapid changes and re-instalments of Patriarchs: from 1595 to 1695, there were sixty-one changes and thirty-one Patriarchs. These frequent changes were encouraged by the Ottoman authorities who received a fee for each appointment. Joannicius II too was subject to recurring depositions and re-election: he was deposed on 28 October 1648, re-installed for the second time in June 1651, deposed in June 1652, and he reigned again from April 1653 to March 1654 and from March 1655 to July 1656.

In 1654 he was imprisoned for being the main cause of the accumulating debts of the Patriarchate towards the Ottoman Porte. After the last deposition in 1656, he was appointed bishop of Kea and Thermia, where he retired until his death in 1659 or 1660.

To strengthen his position towards his opponents, he looked for the support of the Ferdinand III, Austrian Emperor and of Rome. For this reason, he allowed Catholic missions to be settled in the Black Sea coasts and in the Cyclades. Despite this, refused to sign a Catholic profession of faith as asked by Propaganda Fide, pleading his precarious position.

== Notes and references ==
Religious titles
| Preceded by Parthenius II | Ecumenical Patriarch of Constantinople; 1646 – 1648 | Succeeded by Parthenius II (2) |
| Preceded by Parthenius II (2) | Ecumenical Patriarch of Constantinople; 1651 – 1652 | Succeeded by Cyril III |
| Preceded by Paisius I | Ecumenical Patriarch of Constantinople; 1653 – 1654 | Succeeded by Cyril III (2) |
| Preceded by Paisius I (2) | Ecumenical Patriarch of Constantinople; 1655 – 1656 | Succeeded by Parthenius III |
