= Patriarch Paisius =

Patriarch Paisius may refer to:

- Paisius I of Constantinople, Ecumenical Patriarch of Constantinople in 1652–1653
- Patriarch Paisius of Alexandria, Greek Patriarch of Alexandria in 1657–1678
- Paisius II of Constantinople, Ecumenical Patriarch of Constantinople for four times in the 18th century
