= Gabriel II =

Gabriel II may refer to:

- Pope Gabriel II of Alexandria, ruled in 1131–1145
- Gabriel II of Constantinople, Ecumenical Patriarch in 1657
- Gabriel II Barbosa, Brazilian footballer
