= Patriarch Timothy II =

Patriarch Timothy II may refer to:

- Pope Timothy II of Alexandria, Pope of Alexandria & Patriarch of the See of St. Mark in 454–477
- Timothy II (Nestorian Patriarch), Patriarch of the Church of the East from 1318 to ca. 1332
- Patriarch Timothy II of Constantinople, r. 1612–1620
