= Parfyonov =

Parfyonov, Parfionov or Parfenov (Russian: Парфёнов) is a Russian masculine surname, its feminine counterpart is Parfyonova, Parfionova or Parfenova. The surname originates from the Greek masculine given name Parthenius (Παρθένιος, meaning virgin, pure, clean) and may refer to

- Anatoly Parfyonov (1925–1993), Soviet Greco-Roman wrestler
  - 7913 Parfenov, a minor planet named after Anatoly
- Andrey Parfenov (born 1987), Russian cross-country skier
- Denis Parfenov (born 1987), Russian politician
- Dmytro Parfenov (born 1974), Ukrainian and Russian football manager and former player
- Kuzma Parfyonov (1907–1987), Soviet general
- Leonid Parfyonov (born 1960), Russian television journalist
- Nikolai Parfionov (skier) (born 1976), Russian Nordic combined athlete
- Nikolay Parfyonov (actor) (1912–1999), Russian actor
- Tatyana Parfenova (born 1985), Kazakhstani handball player
- Vladimir Parfyonov (born 1970), Uzbekistani javelin thrower
- Yuriy Parfyonov (1946–2025), Russian musician
- Zoya Parfenova (1920–1993), Soviet aviator
