= Patriarch Nectarius =

Patriarch Nectarius may refer to:

- Nectarius of Constantinople, ruled in 381–397
- Nectarius of Jerusalem, ruled in 1661–1669
