= Parthenius =

Parthenius or Parthenios (Greek: Παρθένιος) may refer to:

== People ==
- Parthenius of Nicaea (1st-century BC – 14 AD), Greek grammarian and poet
- The chief chamberlain of Domitian (died 96)
- Saint Parthenius (died 4th-century, Rome), Armenian saint and martyr from Rome, who suffered martyrdom during the reign of Decius
- Parthenius of Lampsacus, bishop of Lampsacus in the 4th century, Greek Orthodox patron saint of cancer patients
- Parthenius I of Constantinople (died 1646)
- Parthenius II of Constantinople (died 1651)
- Parthenius III of Constantinople (died 1657)
- Parthenius IV of Constantinople (died after 1685)
- Parthenius I of Alexandria (died 1688)
- Parthenius of Jerusalem (died 1770)
- Parthenius II of Alexandria (died 19th century)
- Parthenius III of Alexandria (1919–1996)

== Geography ==
- A river which is now named Bartın River in northern Anatolia
- Bartın, a city in Turkey
- Mount Parthenion, Greece
