= Cyril II =

Cyril II may refer to:

- Pope Cyril II of Alexandria (ruled 1078–1092)
- Patriarch Cyril II of Alexandria, Greek Patriarch of Alexandria in the 12th century
- Cyril II of Kyiv, the metropolitan of Kyiv from 1242 until his death
- Cyril II of Constantinople, Ecumenical Patriarch of Constantinople in 1633, 1635–1636 and 1638–1639
- Patriarch Cyril II of Jerusalem (ruled (1846–1872)
