= Patriarch Gregory of Constantinople =

Patriarch Gregory of Constantinople may refer to:

- Gregory I of Constantinople, Patriarch in 379–381
- Gregory II of Constantinople, Ecumenical Patriarch of Constantinople in 1283–1289
- Gregory III of Constantinople, Ecumenical Patriarch of Constantinople in 1443–1450
- Gregory IV of Constantinople, Ecumenical Patriarch of Constantinople in 1623
- Gregory V of Constantinople, Ecumenical Patriarch of Constantinople in 1797–1798, 1806–1808 and 1818–1821
- Gregory VI of Constantinople, Ecumenical Patriarch of Constantinople in 1835–1840
- Gregory VII of Constantinople, Ecumenical Patriarch of Constantinople in 1923–1924
