= Patriarch Cyril II =

Patriarch Cyril II may refer to:

- Pope Cyril II of Alexandria, Pope of Alexandria & Patriarch of the See of St. Mark in 1078–1092
- Patriarch Cyril II of Alexandria, Greek Patriarch of Alexandria in the 12th century
- Cyril II of Constantinople, Ecumenical Patriarch of Constantinople in 1633, 1635–1636 and 1638–1639
- Patriarch Cyril II of Jerusalem (ruled in 1846–1872)
