= Patriarch Parthenius III =

Patriarch Parthenius III may refer to:

- Parthenius III of Constantinople, Ecumenical Patriarch of Constantinople in 1656–1657
- Parthenius III of Alexandria, Greek Orthodox Patriarch of Alexandria in 1987–1996
