= Parteniy Pavlovich =

Parteniy Pavlovich (Bulgarian: Партений Павлович) (c. 1695 – 29 April 1760) was a Bulgarian Eastern Orthodox cleric, man of letters and traveller, regarded as one of the precursors of Paisius of Hilendar. A champion of the South Slavic revival, Pavlovich was the author of the first autobiography in South Slavic literature.

== Education and teaching ==
Pavlovich was born around 1695 in Silistra, a port on the Danube river located in the southwestern part of Dobruja. Then ruled by the Ottoman Empire and a major regional centre as the capital of the vast Silistra Province, today the city is part of Bulgaria. His father, Pavel, was a local Bulgarian. Parteniy began his education at the Silistra religious school under the teacher Tetradios; the curriculum at the school was in a Greek dialect. He also studied at a Bulgarian school, where he learned the literary Church Slavonic language, which he would later use in his autobiography and marginal notes. In Silistra, Pavlovich also finished a full grammar course under the teacher Palaiologos from Constantinople.

In 1714, Parteniy Pavlovich continued his education in Bucharest, the capital of Wallachia, where he graduated from the Princely Academy of Saint Sava. At the academy, he was taught theology, humanities, natural science and mathematics. In March 1719, upon graduating from the academy, Pavlovich moved to Padua, Italy in seek of further education. However, he could not come to terms with the Roman Catholic teachings in Padua and would often be involved in dogmatic disputes with the local clergy, which forced him to leave the city. He visited and unsuccessfully attempted to study in Venice, Bologna, Florence, Rome, Naples and Otranto, though he was always in trouble due to his Eastern Orthodox religious views, and had to leave Italy before the end of 1719 after less than half a year there.

After his stay in Italy, he was in southwestern Macedonia as a teacher in Siatista and Kostur (Kastoria). There he also began to teach the rationalism of René Descartes, which the Ecumenical Patriarchate of Constantinople saw as unsuitable. Thus, the Orthodox leaders temporarily removed him from his position until he at least nominally renounced his heretic teachings. After his stay in South Macedonia, Pavlovich was, for a year, a teacher in Risan on the Adriatic coast of Montenegro. In 1721, Pavlovich travelled around the Ohrid region and the mountains of Albania, visiting holy sites of the Orthodox Church.

== Religious figure, traveller and writer ==
In 1722, Pavlovich took the monastic vows and adopted the religious name Parteniy (Parthenius). He was close to the most prominent religious leaders of Serbia, which helped him advance through the clerical ranks of the Serbian Patriarchate of Peć (the Serbian Orthodox Church). In 1728, he was ordained a priest and by 1730 he was in charge of a parish. In 1735, he became a metropolitan bishop's secretary, in 1749 he was ordained as archimandrite, and in 1751 he took holy orders as a vicar bishop of the metropolitan bishop of Karlowitz, Pavle Nenadović. From 1737 to the end of his life, Parteniy was based in the city of Karlowitz in the Habsburg monarchy's Military Frontier (today Sremski Karlovci in Vojvodina, Serbia), a prospering centre of South Slavic education and culture at the time.

In 1733 and 1734–1737, Pavlovich travelled throughout Ottoman-ruled Bulgaria as a pilgrim and hermit. He spent some time in the Rila Monastery in September 1734, where he perused medieval Bulgarian and Greek texts and left behind marginal notes. He signed the Collection of 1483 and left notes on the Rila Charter of 1378, of which he also made a (now lost) copy. In addition, he visited his native Silistra. A Russophile, Pavlovich was for a while imprisoned in Bucharest in 1746 due to allegations that he participated in an anti-Habsburg plot. According to some sources, it was in the Wallachian prison that Pavlovich wrote his autobiography, which testifies to his commitment to the ideas of the Age of Enlightenment and his dream of South Slavic unity. Other sources assert that Pavlovich worked on his autobiography from 1757 to 1760. He died in Austrian Karlowitz in 1760.

Bar his marginal notes in medieval texts, as a writer Pavlovich left behind a few poetical works and many translations of religious books from Greek to Church Slavonic. He is considered the father of the autobiographical genre in South Slavic literature.
