= Athanasius III of Constantinople =

Ecumenical Patriarch of Constantinople in 1634 and 1652

Saint Athanasius III of Constantinople
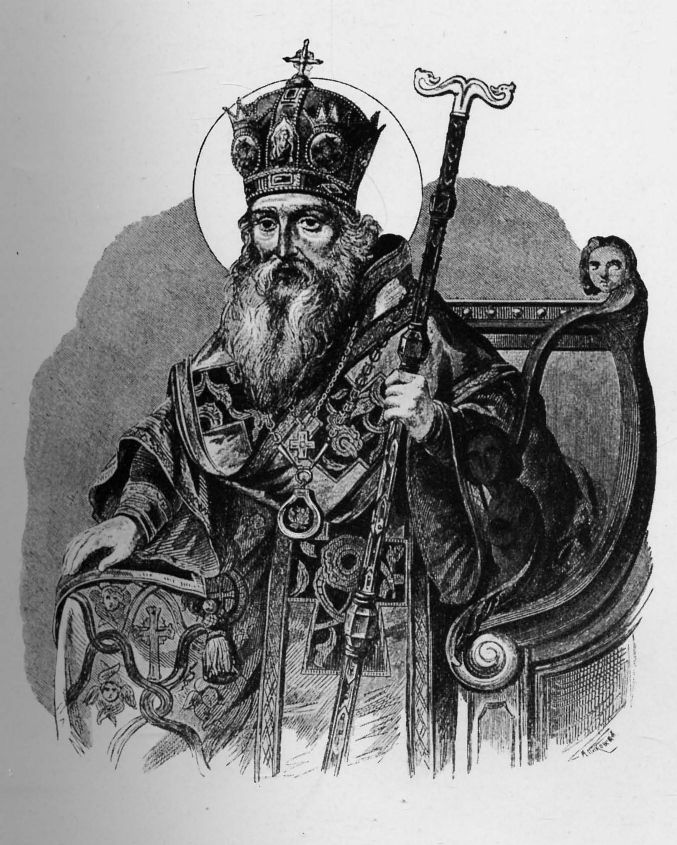

Ecumenical Patriarch of Constantinople
- Venerated in: Russian Orthodox Church and Romanian Orthodox Church
- Canonized: 1670s
- Major shrine: Relics at the Annunciation Cathedral, Kharkiv
- Feast: Synaxis of Athonite Venerables: 2 (15) May
- Patronage: Dubna, Kharkiv

Athanasius III of Constantinople
- Ecumenical Patriarch of Constantinople
- Church: Church of Constantinople
- In office: 25 February 1634 – Early April 1634; June 1652 (15 days)
- Predecessor: Cyril I of Constantinople; Cyril III of Constantinople
- Successor: Cyril I of Constantinople; Paisius I of Constantinople

Personal details
- Born: Alexios Patellarios; 1597 Retimon, Crete
- Died: 5 April 1654 (aged 56–57) Mhar Monastery
- Denomination: Eastern Orthodoxy

Athanasius III of Constantinople (Greek: Ἀθανάσιος; born Alexios Patellarios, Ἀλέξιος Πατελλάριος; Russian: Алексий Пателла́рий; 1597 – 5 April 1654) was the Ecumenical Patriarch of Constantinople in 1634 and 1652. Before his patriarchate, Athanasius was metropolitan of Thessaloniki. He participated at Patriarch Nikon of Moscow's book editing reforms in 1653.

Athanasius III was canonised as an Enlightener into the Synaxis of Athonite Venerables by the Russian Church in the 1670s. His feast date is on 2 (15) May, the 2nd Week after Pentecost, canonised alongside Athanasius of Alexandria.

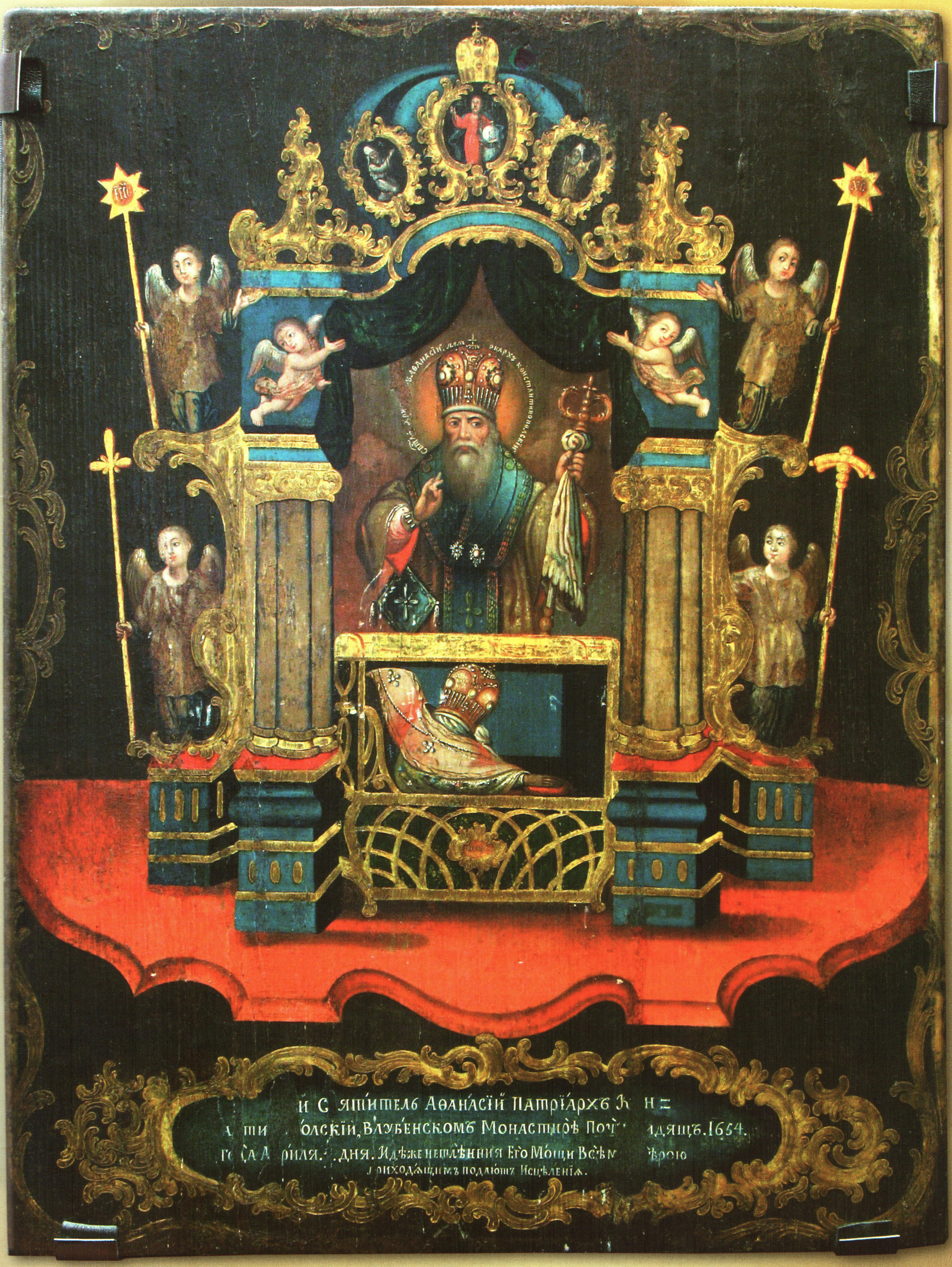
Enlightener Athanasius III, Ecumenical Patriarch of Constantinople, in the Lubensk Monastery, he who rested sitting, Russian icon, 17th century

== Biography ==
Alexios was born to an imperial noble family with roots dating back to the Palaiologos. His father Georgios was a scientist and publisher, and his elder brother Eustaphios was a physician. For 26 years he lived in Crete in the Arkadi Monastery, which was then under Venetian rule and received there his education. Alexios knew well philosophy, Ancient Greek, Latin, Hebrew, Arabic and Italian.

In 1631, Alexios was consecrated as metropolitan bishop of Thessaloniki; he was under the patronage of Ecumenical Patriarch Cyril I of Constantinople. In early 1634, a third opposition against Cyril I regarding the publication of Eastern Confession of the Christian faith in March 1629 was formed in Fanari, as the document had Calvinist theological lines. On 25 February 1634, Athanasius III became Ecumenical Patriarch of Constantinople and was enthroned on 25 March.

After several days he was dethroned by Cyril I, who returned from prison. Athanasius III then escaped to the Mount Athos, where he built the skete (where in 1849 the Russian St. Andrew skete was founded), which kept the icon Consolation in Sorrow and Grief (В скорбех и печалех Утешение).

After his second deposition in 1635, Athanasius III went to Italy, staying in Ancona and Venice. Peter Rietbergen relates, "Landing in Ancona, he was received by the famous Orientalist scholar Father Orazio Giustiniani. After having reached Rome, he swore fealty to the Pope. Consequently, he was given support in manpower and money before returning to Constantinople". He "declared [himself] for Rome", says Steven Runciman. The Pope of Rome advised Athanasius III to become cardinal and accept the Credo with the Filioque, but the saint declined.

In 1637, Athanasius III was called to Constantinople. On 26 June 1638, after Cyril I was strangled by the request of Murad IV, Athanasius III became a pretender to the patriarchate. Parthenius I of Constantinople, Patriarch from 1639 to 1644, required Athanasius III to renounce from the patriarchate and return to the Thessaloniki cathedra. Because of the metropolis' taxes, Athanasius III was imprisoned twice and asked the Russian Tsar Michael of Russia for charity.

In 1643, Michael of Russia moved to Tsardom of Russia, but on the way there became ill and stayed in Moldavia, by the hospodar Vasile Lupu. In Galați he founded the St. Nicholas Monastery as a metochion of St. Catherine's Monastery in Sinai. At that time he wrote the "Hymn to the Mother of God", and an encomium to Lupu.

Athanasius III returned to Constantinople in 1652 and took the patriarchate for the third time. Again holding the throne for a short time, Athanasius III in July 1652 voluntarily renounced from the patriarchate and ad infinitum left Constantinople. During his last patriarchate, he spoke out a sermon mentioning his dissociation with Catholicism. He again went to Moldavia visiting Lupu in Iași, then to Chigirin visiting Bohdan Khmelnytsky. With the deeds of those people for the Tsar he reached Moscow on 16 April 1653, and on 22 April visited Tsar Alexis of Russia.

There he lived at the Kirillov metochion and made his divine service at the Novospassky Monastery and at the Saviour Cathedral by the Terem Palace. In July 1653 Athanasius III visited the Trinity Sergius Monastery.

At the request of Patriarch Nikon of Moscow, Athanasius III wrote The Ordo of the Episcopal Liturgy in the East, which underlined the Muscovian edited Archieratikon of the Episcopal Service, which is used by the Russian Church to date. Athanasius III delivered the Tsar a notebook in which he stated his main reason for his visit to Moscow; that is, to arouse the Tsar unite with Moldavia and the Cossack Hetmanate for a future war with the Turks, after which the Tsar should become the new Roman Emperor, and the Moscow Patriarch – the new Ecumenical Patriarch.

Athanasius III is known as a trader of indulgences, which he sold in large quantities in Ukraine and Russia.

By December 1653, Athanasius III moved to Moldavia for the Nicholas Monastery in Galați. En route, he made a visit to Bohdan Khmelnytsky. In February 1654, he stayed at the Mhar Monastery near Lubny and died on 5 April on Thomas' Week. He was buried by the hegumen of the Transfiguration monastery, his body was in a sitting position on the throne under the ambon.

== Veneration ==
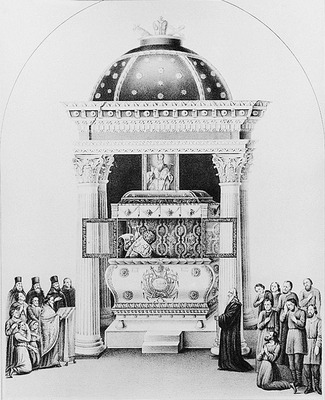
Shrine of Saint Athanasius III at the Lubensk Monastery, lithography, 1868

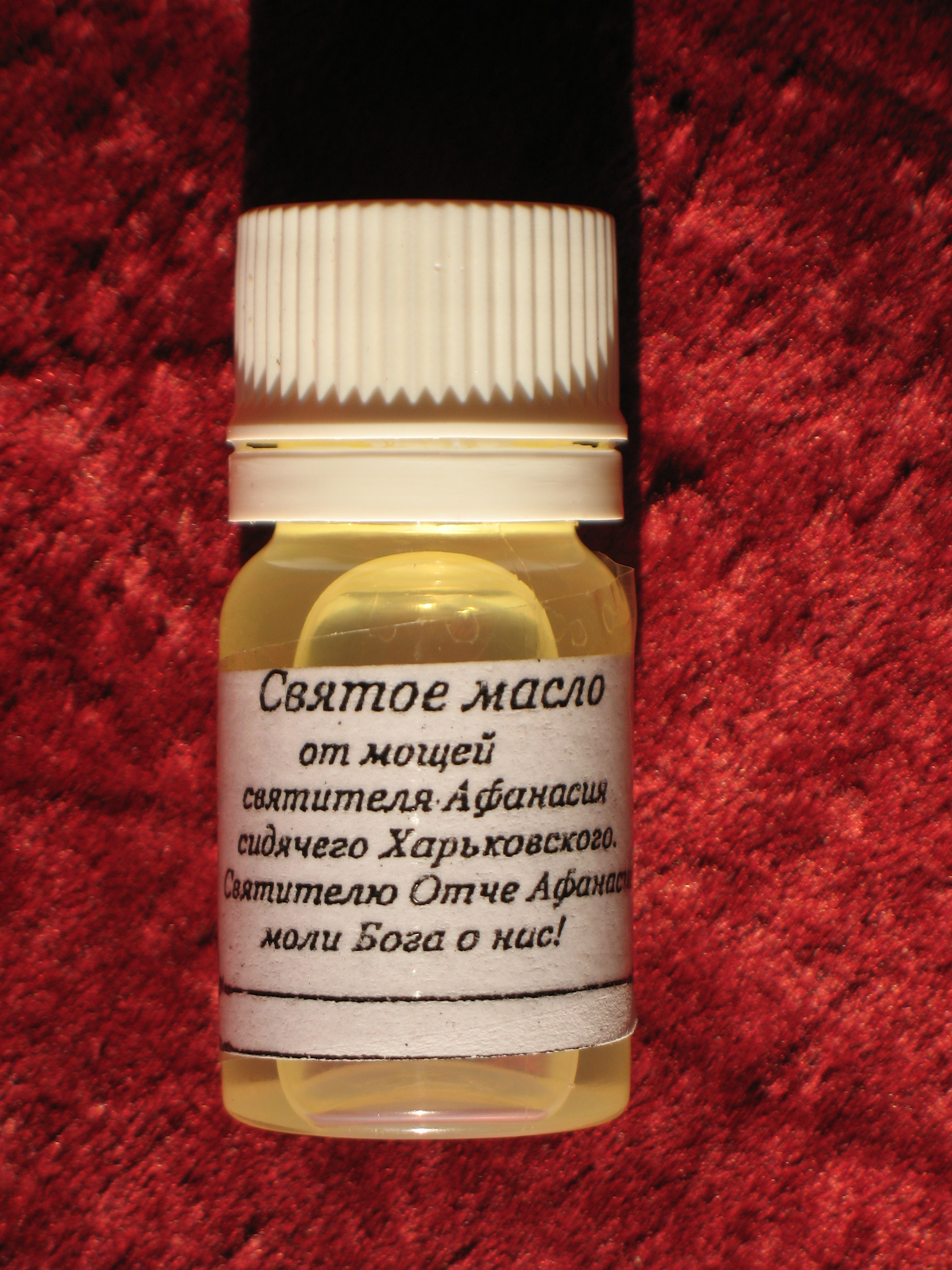
Oil from the relics of Patriarch Athanasius

On 1 February 1662, the saint's relics were translated due to the metropolitan of Gaza Paisios Ligarides, who, visiting Lubensk Monastery, had a vision of Athanasius III during his sleep. In 1672, the Tsar requested podyachy M. Savin to investigate the wonders from the relics. In the 18th century, manuscripts of his hagiography and canon were preserved at the Lubensk Monastery.

In 1818, Methodius (Pishnyachevsky), bishop of Poltava, applied the Most Holy Synod for the canonisation of Athanasius III, but the application was declined. However the saint's honouring and recorded wonders from his relics continued. In the 1860s, church historian Andrey Nikolayevich Muravyov created a new hagiography of Athanasius III with examples of wonders at his relics.

The history of the canonisation of Athanasius III is vague, but the official veneration began in the Russian Church by the end of the 19th century, although Yevgeny Golubinsky through his works proved that the honouring started between 1672 and 1676 under Joseph Tukalskyi-Nelyubovych), metropolitan of Kiev (Ecumenical Patriarchate of Constantinople).

In 1922, the Transfiguration cathedral, including the saint's silver throne, was plundered by the Bolsheviks. The relics were moved to Kharkiv in the 1930s. They were eventually preserved in the city's Annunciation Cathedral in 1947.

== Notes and references ==
Eastern Orthodox Church titles
Preceded by Cyril I (4)	Ecumenical Patriarch of Constantinople; 1634	Succeeded by Cyril I (5)
Preceded by Cyril III	Ecumenical Patriarch of Constantinople; 1652	Succeeded by Paisius I
