= Zoe Verbiceanu =

Romanian writer

- Born: 18 September 1893; Bucharest, Romania
- Died: 30 December 1975 (aged 82); Cetate, Dolj County, Romania
- Resting place: Calafat
- Occupation: Writer
- Years active: 1917-1975

Zoe Verbiceanu (September 18, 1893, Bucharest –December 30, 1975, Cetate, Dolj County) was a Romanian playwright and prose writer.

== Biography ==
Born in Bucharest, into an old family of Oltenian boyars, she attended primary school in her native city. This was followed by two years at the central school in Craiova and then Saint Sava High School in Bucharest.

Verbiceanu enrolled in the University of Bucharest, earning a degree in French and Romanian literature. She began to prepare a doctorate in Paris, but interrupted her studies due to illness. In 1954, she moved to Calafat.

== Career ==
During her career, she worked as a high school teacher of French language and literature.

She was particularly known as a playwright; her works included Rikki-Tikki-Tavi (three-act comedy, 1920), Logodnica lui Don Juan (four-act drama, 1920, revised and expanded in 1962), Anacronicii (four-act drama, 1921), Da capo al fine (one act, performed multiple times on radio, 1931), Pălăria cu clopoței (three-act comedy with verse prologue, 1939) and Nastratin Hogea (three-act verse comedy, 1945).

Verbiceanu's contributions appeared in Viața Românească and Adevărul literar și artistic.

More successful as literature were her prose (the 1929 novel Casa cu minuni) and translations. The latter included William Shakespeare's Comedy of Errors (performed at the National Theatre Bucharest for the 1931–1932 season); Balade after François Villon (1940); and De-ale lui Nastratin, a free adaptation, from memory, of an anthology by Albert Wesselski (1974). Suprema iertare, a 1958 three-act drama, with prologue and epilogue in verse, remains in manuscript form, as does an ample essay on Villon, together with a translation of his complete poetry.
