= Anthimus II of Constantinople =

Ecumenical Patriarch of Constantinople in 1623

- Ecumenical Patriarch of Constantinople
- Church: Church of Constantinople
- Elected: 18 June 1623
- Term ended: 22 September 1623
- Predecessor: Gregory IV of Constantinople
- Successor: Cyril I of Constantinople
- Previous post: Metropolitan of Adrianople

Personal details
- Born: Constantinople
- Died: 1628
- Denomination: Eastern Orthodoxy

Anthimus II of Constantinople (Greek: Ἄνθιμος Β΄) was Ecumenical Patriarch of Constantinople for a few months in 1623.

== Life ==
Anthimus was born in Constantinople to a noble and rich family. Before he was elected as Patriarch of Constantinople, he was Metropolitan of Adrianople.

His short reign has to be considered in the context of the clash between the pro-Calvinist Patriarch Cyril I of Constantinople, supported by the Dutch and English ambassadors, and his opponents supported by the French, Austrian and Republic of Venice ambassadors to the Ottoman capital. The latter were successful at persuading the Grand Vizier to depose Cyril I on 12 April 1623 and to appoint in his place the blind and old Gregory IV of Constantinople. The Metropolitans and the bishops were unsatisfied with Gregory IV because he had not been canonically elected by the Holy Synod. Thus, on 18 June 1623, the Holy Synod deposed Gregory IV and formally elected Anthimus II as Patriarch of Constantinople.

Anthimus II, even if politically supported by the Catholic governments, remained a strong and good Orthodox. He sent metropolitans to Rhodes, where Lucaris was temporarily exiled, to persuade him to retire to Mount Athos, but without success. On the contrary, Lucaris, thanks to the Calvinist Dutch ambassador, returned to Constantinople and produced false instruments of credit for 20,000 Livres on the Patriarchate. Anthimus II could not find such large amount and was forced to abdicate on 22 September 1623. Subsequently, Cyril I returned on the patriarchal throne for the third time.

After his resignation, Anthimus II retired on Mount Athos where he died in 1628.

== Notes and references ==
Eastern Orthodox Church titles
Preceded by Gregory IV	Ecumenical Patriarch of Constantinople; 1623	Succeeded by Cyril I (3)
