= Gheorghe Adamescu =

Romanian literary historian and bibliographer

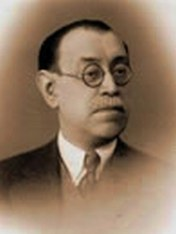
Gheorghe Adamescu

Gheorghe Adamescu (July 23, 1869 – March 4, 1942) was a Romanian literary historian and bibliographer.

Born in Bucharest, his parents were Romanian Orthodox priest Andrei Adamovici and his wife Angelina (née Teodorescu). He attended Saint Sava High School and the literature faculty of the University of Bucharest. Following graduation, Adamescu took specialized courses at the University of Geneva and at the Paris-based École pratique des hautes études and École Nationale des Chartes. His first published work was the 1892 Luptele pentru naționalitate ale românilor în 1848. A high school teacher, his assignments included: inspector general for primary and normal schools in 1902, general secretary at the Public Instruction Ministry in 1911, editorial secretary at Albina from 1897 to 1916 and deputy director at the Mihail Dragomirescu-led Institute of Literature and Bibliography. He was elected a corresponding member of the Romanian Academy in 1921, and was also an affiliate of the Romanian Writers' Society and of the Romanian Athenaeum. His submissions appeared in Revista literară, Convorbiri Literare, România, România Literară, Satira, Tocila, Peleșul, Ritmul vremii and Anuarul Ateneului Român. He wrote a number of important works of bibliography; his contribution to literary history includes a 1914 history of Romanian literature.
