= Mhar Monastery =

Eastern Orthodox monasteries in Ukraine

- Ukrainian: Мгарський Спасо-Преображенський монастир
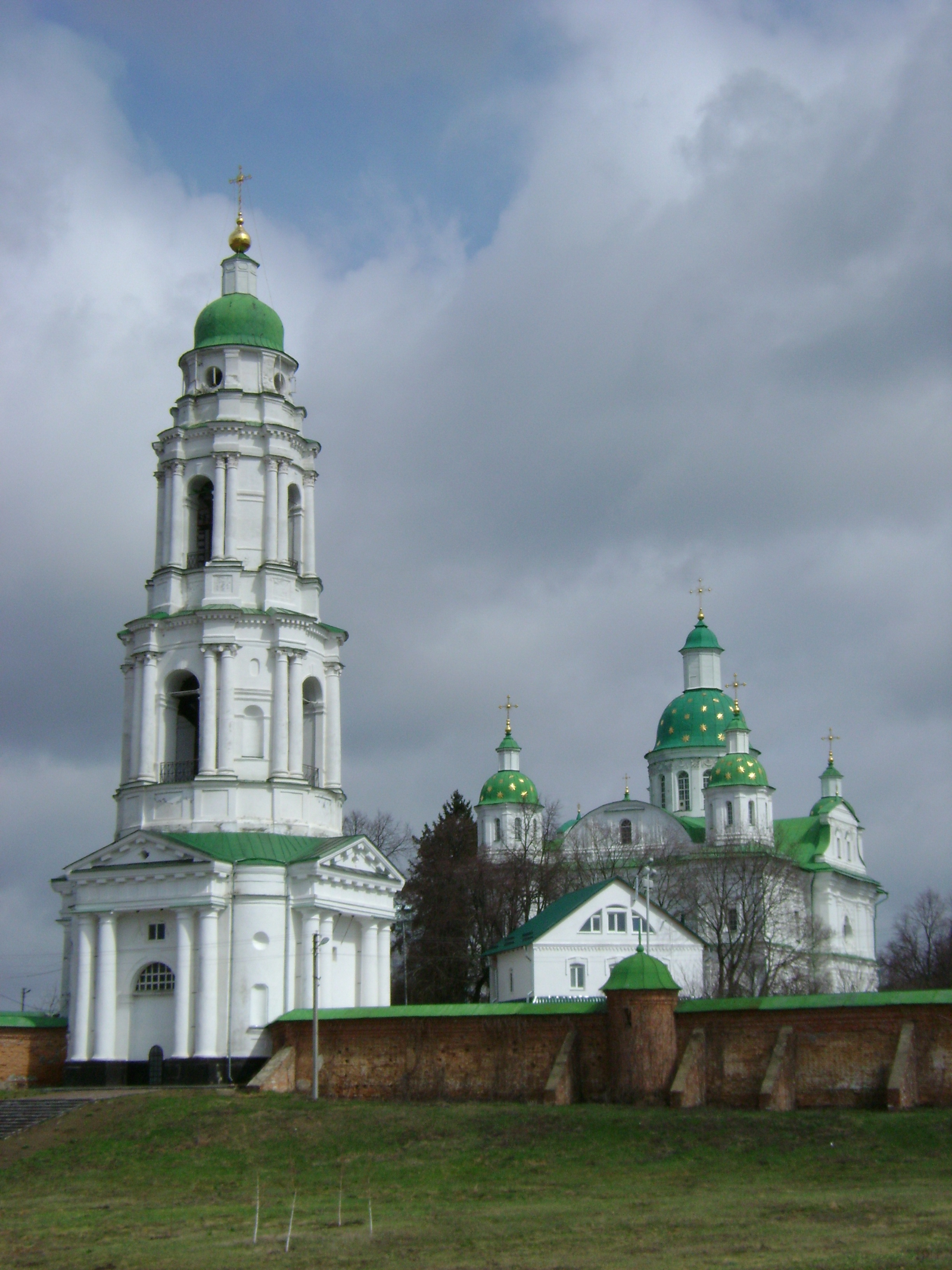
- Transfiguration Monastery at Mhar

- Location within Poltava Oblast Location within Ukraine
- Interactive map of the Mhar Monastery area
- Alternative names: Saviour-Transfiguration Mhar Monastery

General information
- Architectural style: Ukrainian Baroque
- Location: Mhar, Poltava Oblast, Ukraine
- Coordinates: 50°01′47″N 33°03′18″E
- Owner: Ukrainian Orthodox Church (Moscow Patriarchate)

Immovable Monument of National Significance of Ukraine
- Official name: Спасо-Преображенський Мгарський монастир (комплекс) (Saviour-Transfiguration Mhar Monastery (complex))
- Type: Architecture
- Reference no.: 160054

The Mhar Monastery (Ukrainian: Мгарський монастир; full name: Saviour-Transfiguration Mhar Monastery) is a male monastery of the Ukrainian Orthodox Church (Moscow Patriarchate) on the bank of the Sula River near Lubny, Poltava Oblast, Ukraine. Originally built by the Ukrainian clergy of the Ecumenical Patriarchate of Constantinople, since the 18th century Battle of Poltava, it has belonged to the Russian Orthodox Church.

== History ==
The monastery was founded in 1619 by Isaia Kopynsky (who later became the Metropolitan of Kyiv of the reinstated Ruthenian Orthodox Church) on the money of Princess Regina Wiśniowiecka (cousin of Metropolitan Petro Mohyla) as a bratstvo designed to become a bulwark of Orthodoxy in the eastern part of the Polish–Lithuanian Commonwealth.

The monastery grounds contain the graves of several Kyivan metropolitans. It was there that Yurii Khmelnytsky took his tonsure as Hedeon and St. Athanasius III of Constantinople (an ecumenical patriarch) died and was buried.

The Ukrainian Baroque katholikon was erected in the 1680s with the help of a generous grant from Hetmans Ivan Samoylovych and Ivan Mazepa. The seven-domed church with six piers was designed by German architect Johann Baptist Sauer of Vilna, who had worked on the Trinity Cathedral in Chernihiv. The number of domes was reduced to five after the central cupola had collapsed in 1728. A free-standing Neoclassical bell tower was started in 1785, but was not completed until 60 years later.

During the 18th and 19th centuries Mhar was famous for the sweet plums cultivated in its gardens. Local plums were popular as an ingredient of nalyvka and uzvar, and would also be preserved by canning.

After 1925 the monastery was occupied by the leaders of the so-called Lubny Schism, then under the Bolshevik administration it housed a succession of institutions for children, including a Young Pioneer camp, until the monks were allowed to return there in 1993.

On November 22, 2013, President of Ukraine Viktor Yanukovych signed a decree "On Measures to Celebrate the 400th Anniversary of the Founding of the Mhar Monastery", which provides for the implementation of measures to preserve and restore buildings and objects located on the territory of the Mhar Monastery, as well as the construction of a library building in 2014-2019.

== Architecture ==
The main building of the monastery is the Saviour Transfiguration Cathedral, whose façade is adorned by a mosaic and numerous stucco plant ornaments. Similar decorations are present on the nearby bell tower. The original project of the cathedral, designed during the rule of Ivan Mazepa, had beуn much more austere than the current structure: stucco details were added only during the second third of the 18th century according to fashion of the time. The cathedral and other buildings of the monastery have traits typical for Ukrainian Baroque, such as flower-shaped rounded windows, curved upper parts of the façade, faceted walls, pear-shaped domes and prevalence of white in the colour scheme. The monastery complex is surrounded by a wall.

The cathedral's original iconostasis was destroyed during the times of Bolshevik rule in the 1930s. Its modern version was recreated with the use of archive photos on the base of the iconostasis from Velyki Sorochyntsi, which had been created by the same masters.

== Gallery ==
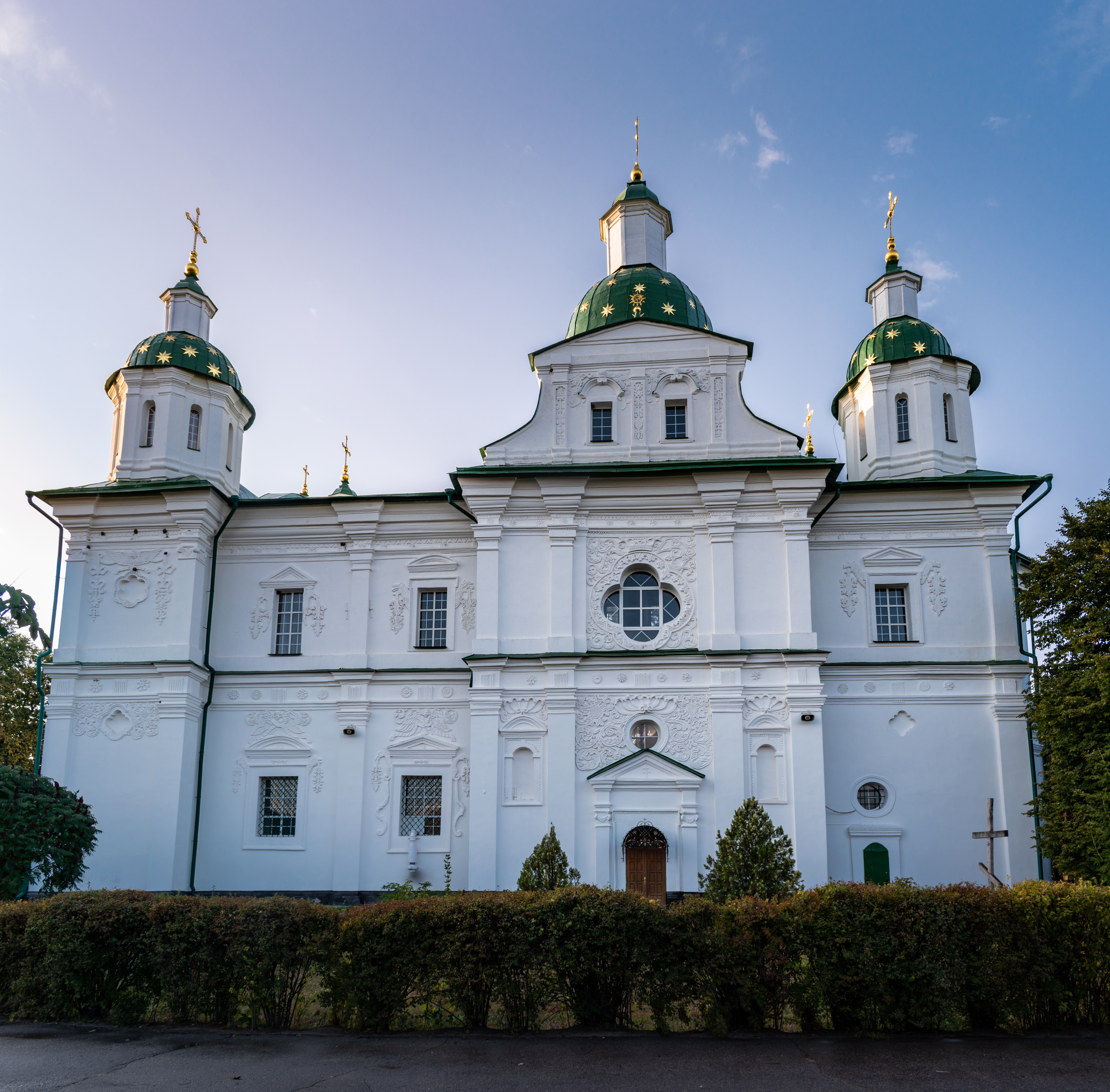
Side view of the cathedral

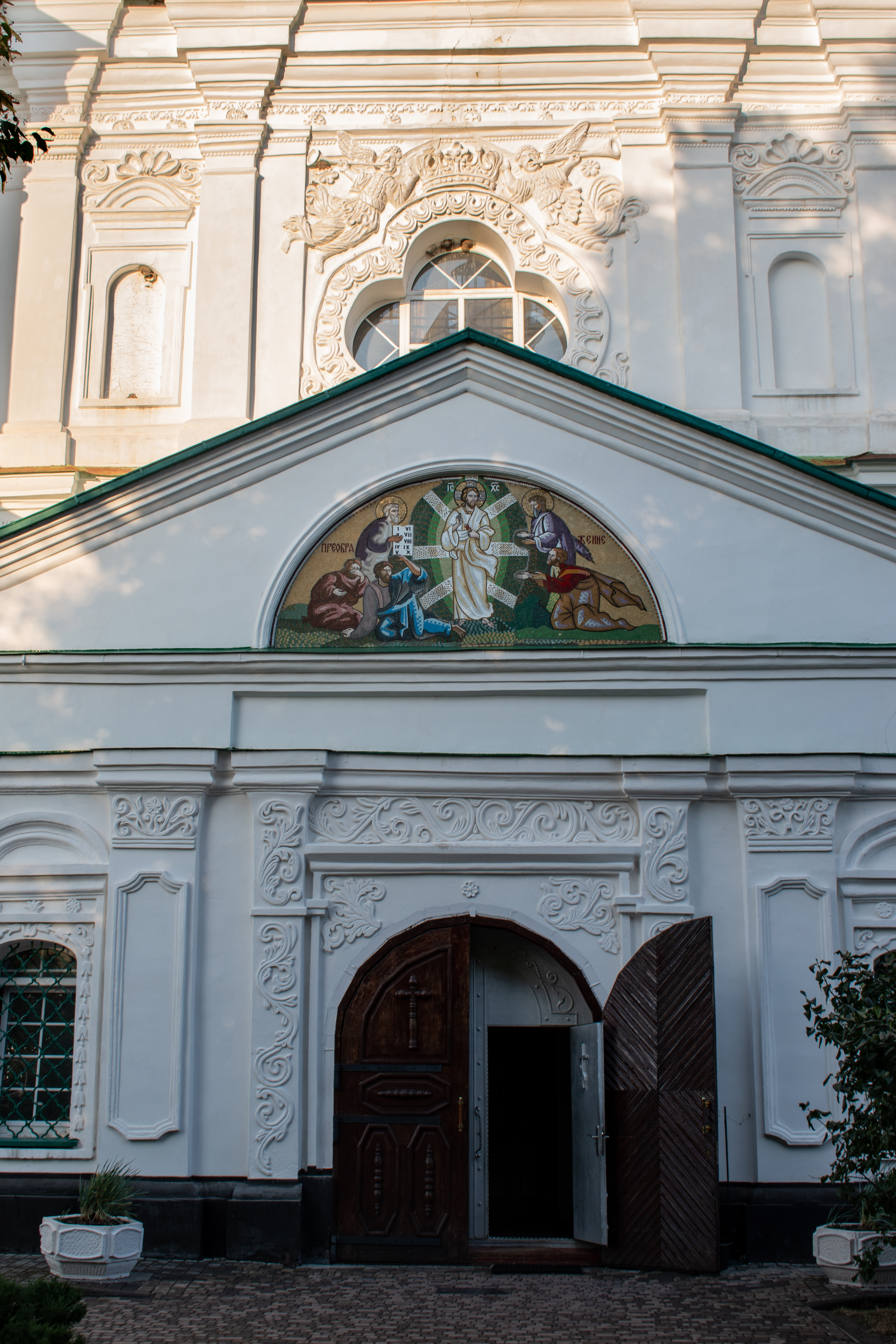
Mosaic and decorative figures over the entrance

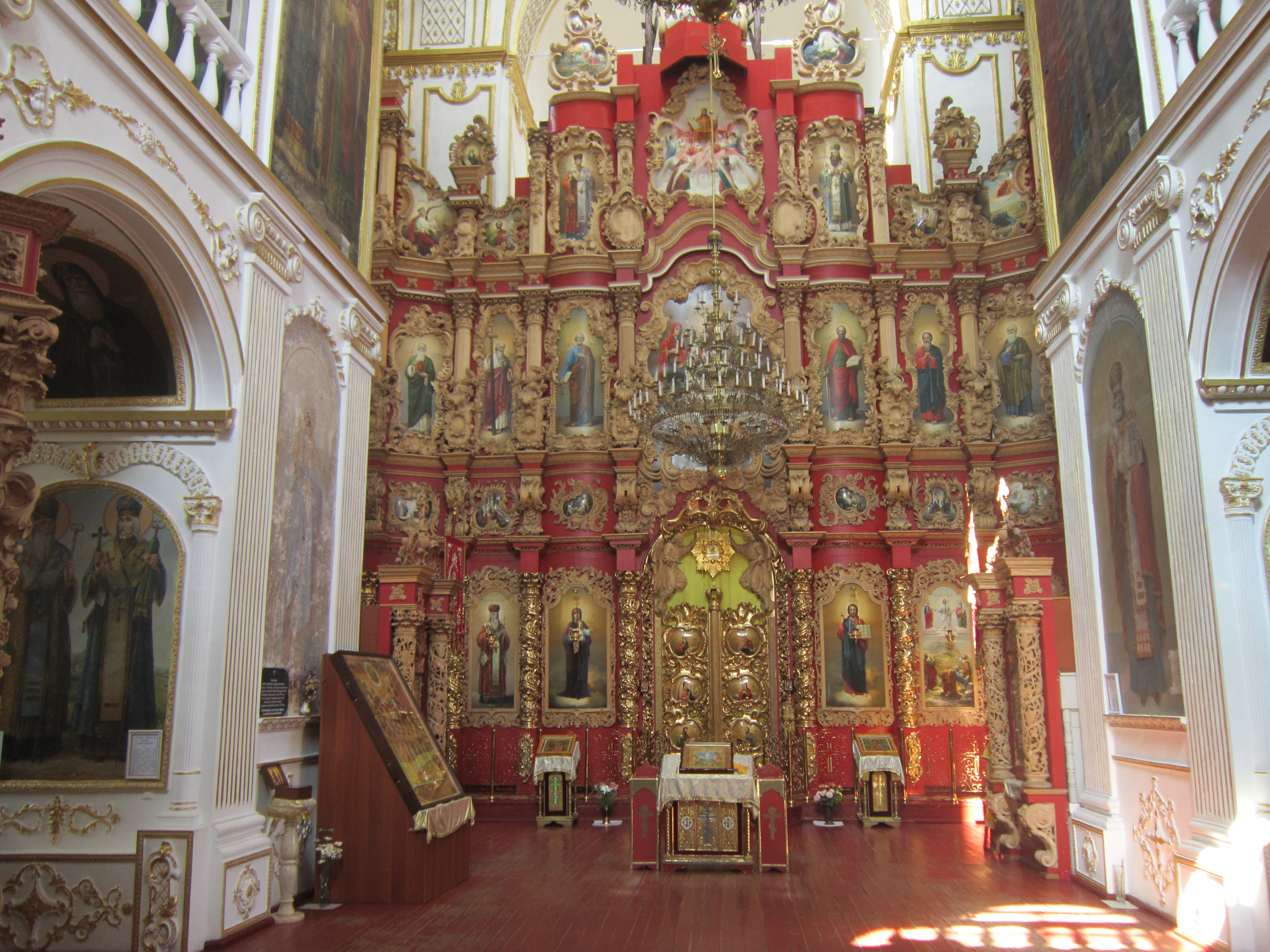
Interior of the cathedral

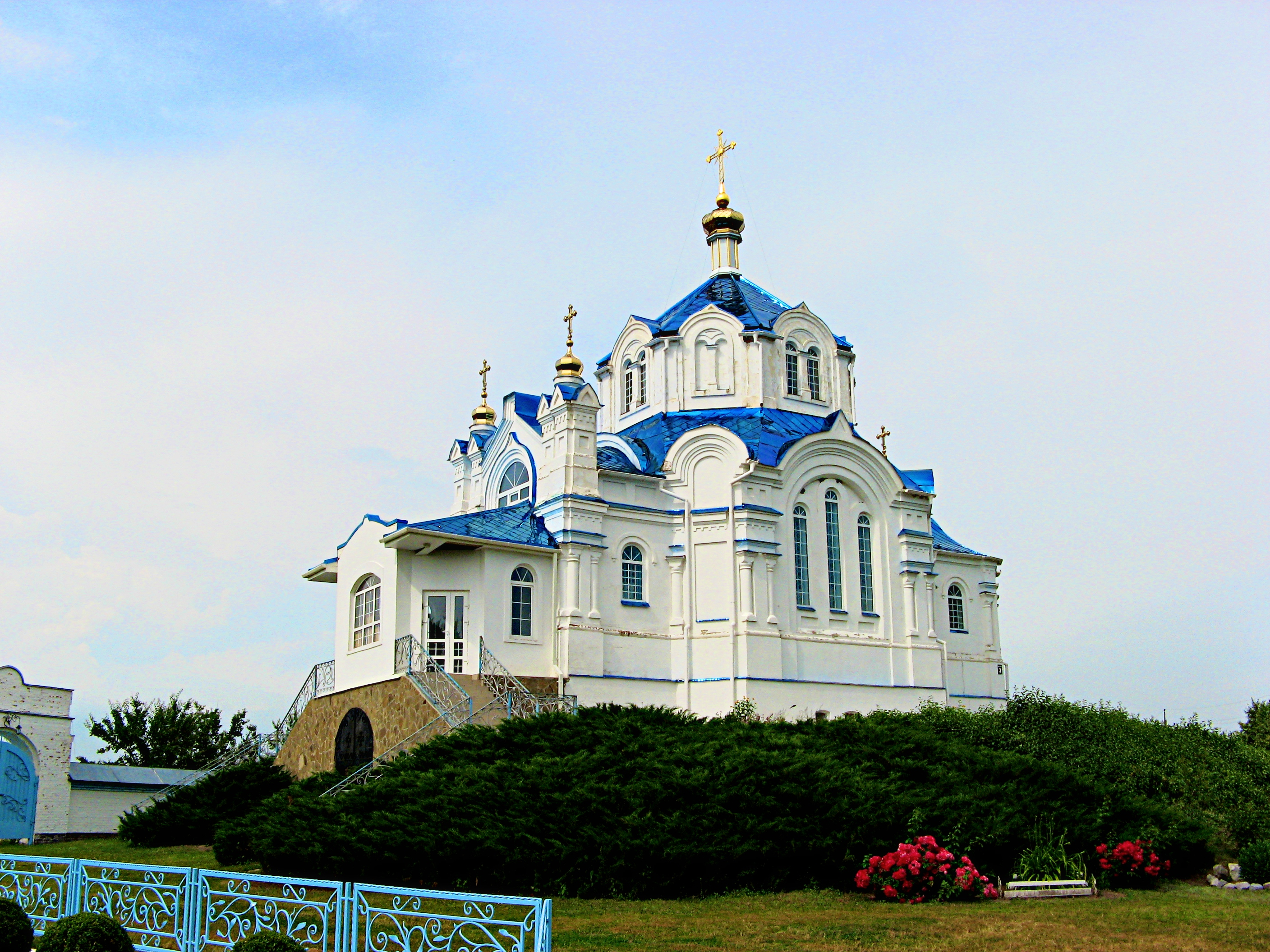
Anunciation Church

== Important burials ==
- Athanasius III of Constantinople
- Joseph Tukalskyi-Nelyubovych
- Seraphim II of Constantinople
