= Synod of Jerusalem (1672) =

Eastern Orthodox synod (1672)

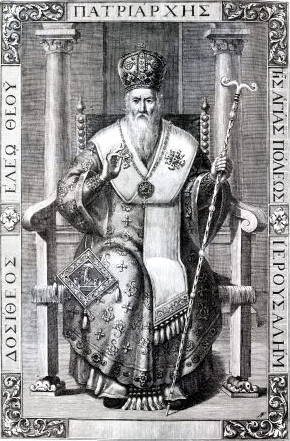
Patriarch Dositheus II of Jerusalem, the convoker and president of the Council.

The Synod of Jerusalem was an Eastern Orthodox synod held in 1672. It is also called the Synod of Bethlehem, because the synod took place at the Church of the Nativity at Bethlehem.

The synod was convoked and presided over by Patriarch Dositheus of Jerusalem. The synod produced a confession referred to as the Confession of Dositheus. The synod rejected the doctrine of the Protestant Reformers, and also attempted to "articulate the dogmatic heritage of [Eastern] Orthodoxy in face of the dispute between Catholics and Protestants". The synod "defined [Eastern] Orthodox dogma in areas at issue in the Western Reformation".

== Background: Cyril Lucaris ==
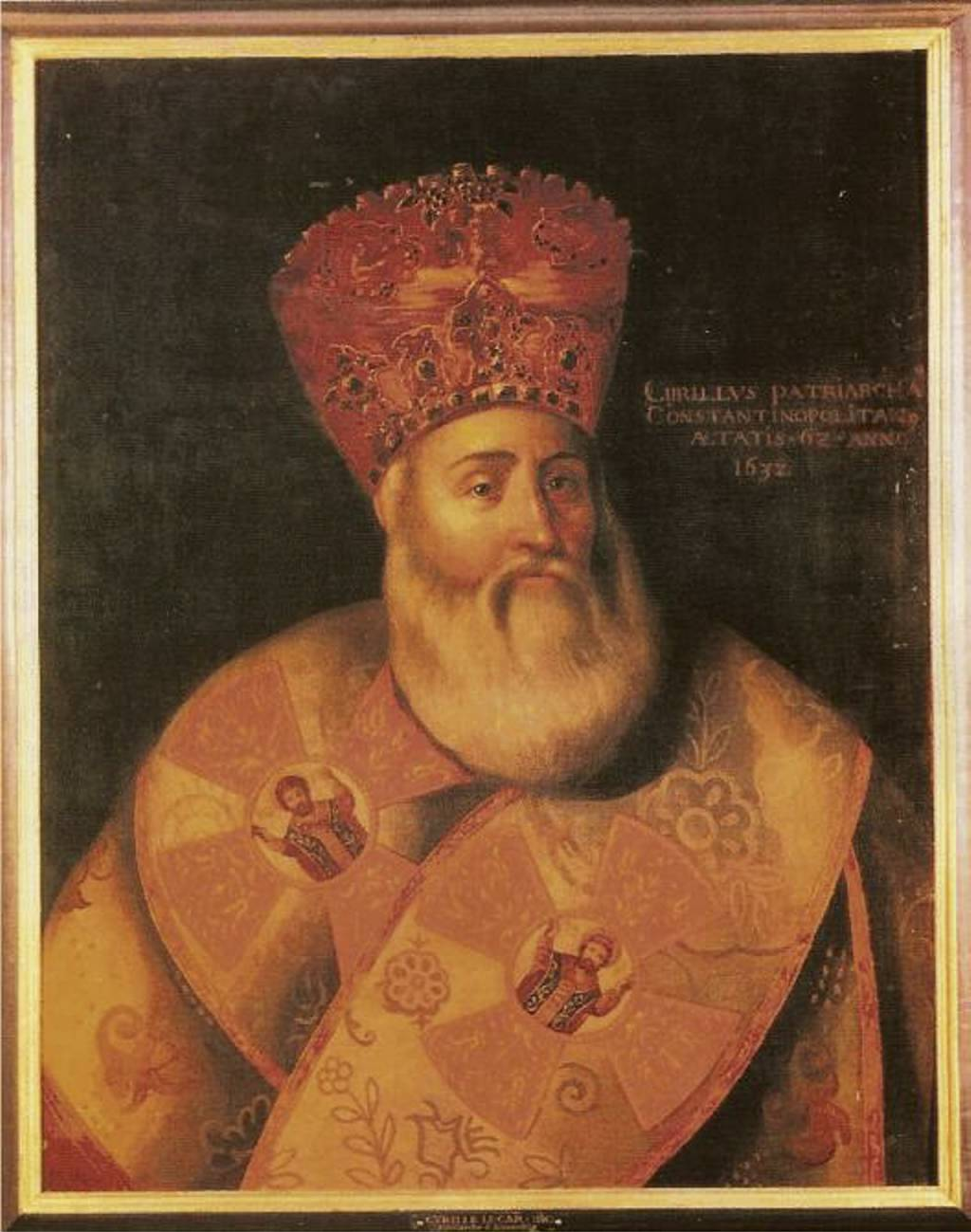
Cyril Lucaris, alleged to have published Calvinist doctrine

In 1629, a small book in Latin, attributed to Cyril Lucaris, the Patriarch of Constantinople, and commonly referred to as the Confession of Cyril Lucaris, was published in Geneva. It contained an eighteen-point summary of beliefs that conformed with Calvinist teaching. French, English and German translations appeared in the same year. A Greek version called Eastern Confession of the Christian Faith appeared in Constantinople in 1631 or 1633. Lucaris was accused of adopting in this book Calvinistic views and asserting that Calvinism was in fact the faith of the Eastern Church. His Eastern Orthodox defenders claim that the book was a forgery. Patriarch Cyril himself verbally denied writing it on several occasions and proclaimed his Orthodox faith with his attitude and in his letters, only not disavowing the said "Confession" in writing.

Cyril Lucaris died in 1638.

Lucaris' Confession was condemned by the 1638 Synod of Constantinople and the 1642 Synod of Jassy.

== Name, date and location ==
The Synod of Jerusalem is also called Synod of Bethlehem, because the synod took place at the Church of the Nativity at Bethlehem. It is also possible that the synod is referred to as Synod of Bethlehem because Patriarch Dositheus of Jerusalem summoned it on the occasion of consecrating said Church of the Nativity in 1672.

The synod was summoned in March 1672 and then took place the same year.

== Synod and decisions ==
The synod rejected the doctrine of the Protestant Reformers, and also attempted to "articulate the dogmatic heritage of [Eastern] Orthodoxy in face of the dispute between Catholics and Protestants". The synod "defined [Eastern] Orthodox dogma in areas at issue in the Western Reformation".

The Synod refuted the Confession of Lucaris article by article.

The synod affirmed "the teaching role of the church and therefore of tradition against Protestant sola scriptura". The synod also affirmed "the role of love and grace, and therefore of deeds, in justification". The synod affirmed the seven mysteries (sacraments) and that those are not "merely symbolic or expressive"; moreover, the synod affirmed that the Christ was truly present in the eucharist and taught this by using the Greek equivalent to the Latin transubstantiatio, metousiosis (μετουσίωσις). The synod also rejected the theses of unconditional predestination and of justification by faith alone.

The synod also "confirmed the canonicity of the deutero-canonical books of the Old Testament, rejecting the Protestant shorter, Hebrew canon".

The Synod affirmed that the Holy Ghost proceeds from God the Father alone and not from both Father and Son.

== Signing ==
The acts of the synod are signed by Dositheus, his predecessor the ex-patriarch Nectarius, six metropolitans and bishops, the Archimandrite of the Holy Sepulchre, Josaphat, and a great number of other archimandrites, priests, monks, and theologians. There are sixty-eight signatures in total. The Church of Russia was represented by a monk, Timothy.

== Acts of the synod ==
The acts of the synod are dated 20 March 1672; they bear the title: Christ guides. A shield of the Orthodox Faith, or the Apology composed by the Synod of Jerusalem under the Patriarch of Jerusalem Dositheus against the Calvinist heretics, who falsely say that the Eastern Church thinks heretically about God and Divine things as they do.

The first part begins by quoting the text: "There is a time to speak and a time to be silent", which text is explained and enlarged upon at length. It tells the story of the summoning of the synod, and vehemently denies that the Eastern Orthodox Church ever held the opinions attributed to Patriarch Cyril Lucaris. To show this, the relations between the Lutherans and Jeremias II of Constantinople are quoted as well as the acts of former synods (Constantinople and Yassy). An elaborate attempt is then made to prove that Lucaris did not really write the famous Confession. To do this, the Confession is compared clause by clause with other statements made by him in sermons and in other works.

In chapter ii, the synod declares that in any case Lucaris showed the Confession to no one, and tries to find further reasons for doubting its authorship.

Chapter iii maintains that, even if Lucaris had written the confession attributed to him, it would not thereby become a confession of the faith of the Eastern Orthodox Church, but would remain merely the private opinion of a heretic.

Chapter iv defends the Eastern Orthodox Church by quoting its formularies, and contains a list of anathemas against the perceived heresies of the Confession of Lucaris.

Chapter v again tries to defend Lucaris by quoting various deeds and sayings of his and transcribes the whole decree of the synod of Constantinople of 1639, and then that of Yassy (Giasion) of 1641.

Chapter vi gives the decrees of this synod in the form of a "Confession of Dositheus". It has eighteen decrees (horoi), followed by four "questions" (eroteseis) with long answers. In these, all the points denied by Lucaris' Confession (relationship between the Church and the Bible, Eastern Orthodox understanding of predestination, cult of saints, sacraments, the Real Presence, the liturgy, liturgy being a real sacrifice, etc.) are maintained at great length and in the most uncompromising way. A short epilogue closes the acts. Then follow the date, signatures, and seals.

== Aftermath ==
Protestant writers say that the strong hostility toward Protestantism of the synod was the product of the Jesuits, of the French ambassador at that time, Olivier de Nointel, and of other Catholics who were undermining the Eastern Orthodox Church.

In their correspondence with the 18th-century Non-Juror Anglican bishops, the Eastern Patriarchs insisted on acceptance of the Synod's teaching on transubstantiation.

== Importance ==
The 1911 Encyclopædia Britannica called the confession of the Synod of Jerusalem "the most vital statement of faith made in the Greek Church during the past thousand years."

The 1910 Catholic Encyclopedia states the decrees of the synod "have been accepted unreservedly by the whole [Eastern] Orthodox Church. They were at once approved by the other patriarchs, the Church of Russia, etc.; they are always printed in full among the symbolic books of the [Eastern] Orthodox Church, and form an official creed or declaration in the strictest sense, which every [Eastern] Orthodox Christian is bound to accept." Nevertheless, Eastern Orthodox Metropolitan Kallistos Ware describes the synod as one among many held in the period of the ecumenical councils whose "statements of faith have in part been received [...] but in part set aside or corrected".

Protestant scholar Philip Schaff wrote: "This Synod is the most important in the modern history of the Eastern Church, and may be compared to the Council of Trent. Both fixed the doctrinal status of the Churches they represent, and both condemned the evangelical doctrines of Protestantism. Both were equally hierarchical and intolerant, and present a strange contrast to the first Synod held in Jerusalem, when 'the apostles and elders,' in the presence of 'the brethren,' freely discussed and adjusted, in a spirit of love, without anathemas, the great controversy between the Gentile and the Jewish Christians."

The 1672 Synod was listed among the councils of "universal authority" by the Pan-Orthodox Council when it met in 2016.
