= Neagu Rădulescu =

Romanian businessman (1912 - 1972)

- Born: December 26, 1912; Bucharest, Kingdom of Romania
- Died: February 3, 1972 (aged 59)
- Education: University of Bucharest
- Occupations: Prose writer and caricaturist

Neagu Rădulescu (December 26, 1912 – February 3, 1972) was a Romanian prose writer and caricaturist.

== Early years ==
Born in Bucharest, his parents were Petru Rădulescu, a clerk, and his wife Ecaterina, a ballerina. He attended Sfântul Iosif primary school and Saint Sava National College in his native city, followed by the literature and philosophy faculty of the University of Bucharest from 1931 to 1936.

== Career ==
His written debut took place in Revista Liceului "Sf. Sava" in 1927. Publications that ran his work include Cronica, Facla, Viața literară, and Reporter, and after 1944, România Literară, Luceafărul and Tribuna. In 1931, he founded XY magazine. This was followed in 1933 by Herald, a literary newsletter he launched together with Miron Suru. Contributors to the latter publication included Eugène Ionesco, Eugen Jebeleanu, Emil Botta, Vasile Voiculescu and Anton Holban.

Rădulescu's first book was Dragostea noastră cea de toate zilele (1934), a short story collection. Other volumes of sketches and short stories are Nimic despre Japonia (1935), 4 pe trimestrul 2 (1942) and Fetele au crescut (1943). His novels are Sunt soldat și călăreț (1937), Napoleon fugea repede (1947), and Paiațe (1947). He also published albums of caricatures and children's books. Turnul Babel, which appeared in 1940 and had reached a third edition by 1946, pleasantly depicts a panorama of the literary world at the end of the interwar period. The commentary and illustrations come from an author who frequented literary cafés, a humorist with lyrical and evocative tendencies.
