= Neophytus III of Constantinople =

Ecumenical Patriarch of Constantinople from 1636 to 1637

- Ecumenical Patriarch of Constantinople
- Church: Church of Constantinople
- In office: June 1636 – 5 March 1637
- Predecessor: Cyril II of Constantinople
- Successor: Cyril I of Constantinople

Personal details
- Died: After 1637
- Denomination: Eastern Orthodoxy

Neophytus III of Constantinople (Greek: Νεόφυτος; died after 1637) was Ecumenical Patriarch of Constantinople from June 1636 to 5 March 1637.

== Bibliography ==
- Frazee, Charles A. (2006) [1983]. Catholics and Sultans - The Church and the Ottoman Empire 1453–1923. Cambridge: Cambridge University Press.

Eastern Orthodox Church titles
Preceded by Cyril II (2)	Ecumenical Patriarch of Constantinople; 1636 – 1637	Succeeded by Cyril I (6)
