= Synod of Jassy =

Eastern Orthodox Synod (25 Sept.–27 Oct. 1642) convened in Iași

The Synod of Jassy or Synod of Iași (also referred to as the Council of Jassy or the Council of Iași), was convened in Iași in Moldavia (present-day Romania) between 15 September and 27 October 1642 by the Ecumenical Patriarch Parthenius I of Constantinople, with the support of the Moldavian Prince Vasile Lupu.

The purpose of the synod was to counter what the Eastern Orthodox considered Protestant doctrinal errors that had entered Eastern Orthodox Christian theology, and to offer a comprehensive Eastern Orthodox statement on the content and character of the Eastern Orthodox faith.

Including representatives of the Greek and Slavic Churches, it condemned the Calvinist teachings ascribed to Cyril Lucaris and ratified (a somewhat amended text of) Peter Mogila's Expositio fidei (Statement of Faith, also known as the Orthodox Confession), a description of Christian orthodoxy in a question and answer format. The Statement of Faith became fundamental for establishing the Eastern Orthodox world's attitude toward Reformation thought. The major contribution of the synod was the reinforced sense of unity in the Eastern Orthodox Church through the promulgation of an authoritative statement agreed upon by all the major sees.
