= Gabriel II of Constantinople =

Ecumenical Patriarch of Constantinople in 1657

- Ecumenical Patriarch of Constantinople
- Church: Church of Constantinople
- Appointed: 23 April 1657
- Term ended: 30 April 1657 (7 days)
- Predecessor: Parthenius III of Constantinople
- Successor: Parthenius IV of Constantinople
- Other post: Metropolitan of Prousa
- Previous posts: Metropolitan of Ganos and Chora

Personal details
- Died: 3 December 1659 Prousa (Bursa)

Sainthood
- Feast day: 3 December
- Venerated in: Eastern Orthodox Church

Gabriel II of Constantinople (Greek: Γαβριήλ; died 3 December 1659) was Ecumenical Patriarch of Constantinople for one week in 1657.

In 1659 he was hanged by the Ottoman Sultan for having baptised a converted Muslim, and after refusing to abjure his own Christian faith. He is hence revered as New Hieromartyr Gabriel II, Metropolitan of Prousa and his feast in the Eastern Orthodox Church is 3 December.

== Life ==
Gabriel was elected Metropolitan of Ganos and Chora on 23 March 1648 for a first term which lasted until 26 November 1651, and again in 1654. After the execution of Parthenius III of Constantinople he was appointed as the new Patriarch on 23 April 1657 with the support of the Greek Orthodox nobility. However, the Holy Synod considered him uneducated and unsuitable for the throne, and deposed him a few days later, on 30 April 1657.

After his deposition, besides his diocese of Ganos, he was given the position of administrator (proedros) of the vacant Metropolitan See of Prousa (Bursa). Here he was accused by the Jewish community to have baptised a Muslim, even if actually the baptised was a Jews and not a Muslim. He was also charged with maintaining good relations with the Russians, at the time at war with the Ottoman Empire.

Sultan Mehmed IV was in those days in Bursa, and his Grand vizier Köprülü Mehmed Pasha imprisoned Gabriel II, and promised him freedom and honor in change to conversion to Islam. Gabriel II refused and was tortured and finally hanged on 3 December 1659.

== Notes and references ==
Eastern Orthodox Church titles
Preceded by Parthenius III	Ecumenical Patriarch of Constantinople; 1657	Succeeded by Parthenius IV
