= Parthenius III of Constantinople =

Ecumenical Patriarch of Constantinople from 1656 to 1657

- Ecumenical Patriarch of Constantinople
- Church: Church of Constantinople
- Appointed: 26 July 1656
- Term ended: 24 March 1657
- Predecessor: Joannicius II of Constantinople
- Successor: Gabriel II of Constantinople
- Previous post: Metropolitan of Chios

Personal details
- Born: Mytilene, Lesbos
- Died: 24 March 1657 Constantinople
- Buried: Kamariotissa Monastery, Chalki

Sainthood
- Feast day: 24 March
- Venerated in: Eastern Orthodox Church

Parthenius III of Constantinople (Greek: Παρθένιος; died 24 March 1657) was Ecumenical Patriarch of Constantinople in 1656–1657. In 1657 he was charged with treason by the Ottoman Sultan and hanged, after refusing to abjure his own Christian faith. He is hence revered as New Hieromartyr Parthenius III and his feast day in the Eastern Orthodox Church is 24 March.

== Life ==
Parthenius was born in the Island of Lesbos, and in 1639 he was elected metropolitan of Chios. On 26 July 1656 he became Ecumenical Patriarch, succeeding Joannicius II of Constantinople.

Parthenius III, who sided with the Tsardom of Russia in the clashes for the control of the Church in Ukraine, in 1656 denounced the 1643 Confession of Faith of the previous Metropolitan of Kyiv Petro Mohyla, which he deemed to be too close to the Catholic doctrine. The Confession of Faith of Petro Mohyla had been however already approved by all the Greek-speaking Patriarchs in 1643, and it was again approved in 1662 by Patriarch Nectarius of Jerusalem and by the Synod of Jerusalem (1672). Parthenius III also held a burial for the remains, recovered on a shore, of his predecessor Cyril I of Constantinople, who was killed in 1638 on a ship in the Sea of Marmara and his corpse thrown in the waters.

In order to raise funds, Parthenius III sent letters to a Greek bishop in the Tsardom of Russia, at the time a political enemy of the Ottoman Empire. His correspondence was intercepted and delivered to the Grand vizier Köprülü Mehmed Pasha, who decided that Parthenius III should stand for trial charged of treason. Though the accusations were proven false, Sultan Mehmed IV ordered his hanging in order to "set an example for those who may try that in future". The only option he was given to be freed was to convert to Islam, but Parthenius III refused.

Thus on 24 March 1657 a long procession walked with Parthenius III from his prison to a place in Constantinople named "Gate of the Hook" (Parmak Kapi) where he was hanged. He stayed hanged for three days and then was thrown into the sea. His body was found by Christians and was buried in the Kamariotissa Monastery on the island of Chalki.

== Notes and references ==
Eastern Orthodox Church titles
Preceded by Joannicius II (4)	Ecumenical Patriarch of Constantinople; 1656 – 1657	Succeeded by Gabriel II
