= Gregory IV of Constantinople =

Ecumenical Patriarch of Constantinople in 1623

- Ecumenical Patriarch of Constantinople
- Church: Church of Constantinople
- Appointed: 12 April 1623
- Term ended: 18 June 1623
- Predecessor: Cyril I of Constantinople
- Successor: Anthimus II of Constantinople
- Previous post: Metropolitan of Amasya

Personal details
- Died: After 1623 Rhodes, Greece
- Denomination: Eastern Orthodoxy

Gregory IV of Constantinople (Greek: Γρηγόριος; died after 1623) was Ecumenical Patriarch of Constantinople for two months in 1623.

== Life ==
Before he was elected as Patriarch of Constantinople, Gregory IV was Metropolitan of Amasya. At the time of his election, he was old and blind in one eye, and so he was given the sobriquet Stravoamaseias (Greek: Στραβοαμασείας), i.e. the blind of Amasya.

His short reign has to be considered in the context of the clash between the pro-Calvinist Patriarch Cyril I of Constantinople, supported by the Protestant Dutch and English ambassadors to the Ottoman capital, and his opponents supported by the Catholic French, Austrian and Republic of Venice ambassadors. The latter were successful at persuading the Grand vizier to depose Cyril I on 12 April 1623 and to appoint in his place Gregory IV, the head of the pro-Western faction.

Eugenia Kermeli reports, "In 1623, the metropolitan of Amaseia Gregory promised [the French ambassador] Cécy to appoint metropolitans friendly to Rome in case he was elected".

Gregory IV proved to be incompetent and could not pay the appointment fee (peshtesh) due to the Ottoman Sultan. Further the Metropolitans and the bishops were unsatisfied with him because he had not been canonically elected by the Holy Synod. Thus, on 18 June 1623, the Holy Synod deposed Gregory IV and formally elected Anthimus II of Constantinople in his place.

After his deposition, Gregory IV was exiled to the island of Rhodes. The date of his death is not known.

== Bibliography ==
- Frazee, Charles A. (2006) [1983]. Catholics and Sultans - The Church and the Ottoman Empire 1453–1923. Cambridge: Cambridge University Press. ISBN 9780521027007.

Eastern Orthodox Church titles
Preceded by Cyril I (2)	Ecumenical Patriarch of Constantinople; 1623	Succeeded by Anthimus II
