= Dositheus II of Jerusalem =

Greek Orthodox theologian (1641–1707)

His Beatitude Dositheus II
- Patriarch of Jerusalem
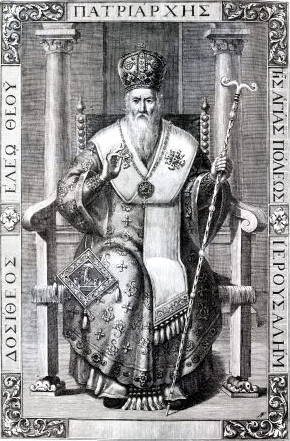
- Engraving of Patriarch Dositheus from his History of the Patriarchate of Jerusalem
- Church: Greek Orthodox Church of Jerusalem
- See: Jerusalem
- Installed: 1669
- Term ended: 8 February 1707
- Predecessor: Nectarius
- Successor: Chrysanthus

Personal details
- Born: 31 May 1641 Arachova, Aigialeia, Achaea
- Died: 8 February 1707 (aged 65) Constantinople, Ottoman Empire

Dositheus II Notaras of Jerusalem (Greek: Δοσίθεος Β΄ Ἱεροσολύμων; Arachova 31 May 1641 – Constantinople 8 February 1707) was the Patriarch of Jerusalem between 1669 and 1707 and a theologian of the Eastern Orthodox Church. He was known for standing against influences of the Roman Catholic and Protestant churches. He convened the Synod of Jerusalem in 1672 to counter the Calvinist confessions alleged to be from Cyril Lucaris.

== Early life ==
Dositheus Notaras was born in Arachova (today the village of Exochi, Aigialeia, Achaea) on 31 May 1641. He was born to Nicholas Skarpetos, a merchant descended from the Notaras family of Greek traders. At 8 years old, he was orphaned by his parents. Little else of his early years are known.

== Clerical career ==
Dositheus entered the monastery of the Holy Apostles in Corinth at 11 years old in 1652, becoming an ordained deacon there that same year. He was elevated to archdeacon of Jerusalem in 1661.

In 1666, he was consecrated archbishop of Caesarea Palestinae (now Caesarea Maritima) at the age of 25. At the time, this office was generally given to the person the Patriarch of Jerusalem chose to be his successor. In 1669, he was elected patriarch of Jerusalem by the Holy Synod of Constantinople.

== Patriarch of Jerusalem ==
He became very involved in the state of the Orthodox Church in the Balkans, Georgia, and southern Russia, particularly after Patriarch Cyril Lucaris of Constantinople set forth in his Confession of Faith (1629) his agreement in the doctrines of predestination and justification by faith alone. In 1672, Patriarch Dositheus convened the Synod of Jerusalem which rejected all the Calvinist doctrines and reformulated Orthodox teachings in a manner that distinguished them from Roman Catholicism as well as Protestantism.

In correspondence with Peter I of Russia, he objected to Peter's reforms that subjected the church to the state, particularly with his abolition of the Patriarchate of Moscow. Dositheus failed in his attempt to get Peter to intercede for the Eastern Orthodox Church in the peace treaty with the Ottoman Empire in 1700.

Dositheus was an "instancabile editore di cose non sue" ("indefatiguable editor of other people's works"), "theologorum Graecorum opera non pauca prelo mandavit ... fuit enim potius compilator et alienorum editor quam novorum auctor" ("he printed not few works of Greek theologicians ... he was a compiler and editor of other people's works, rather than author of original works"). The main works published during his life were a three-volumes collection of anti-Latin works: Τόμος καταλλαγῆς [The tome of the Reconciliation], Τόμος ἀγάπης [The tome of Love], Τόμος χαρᾶς [The tome of Joy], all printed in Jaşi, 1692–1705.

=== Death ===
Dositheus died in Constantinople on 8 February 1707.

In 1715, his twelve-volume History of the Patriarchate of Jerusalem was published posthumously.

== Bibliography ==
- Vassa Kontouma, «Vestiges de la bibliothèque de Dosithée II de Jérusalem au Métochion du Saint-Sépulcre à Constantinople», in A. Binggeli, M. Cassin, M. Detoraki, A. Lampadaridi, Bibliothèques grecques dans l’Empire ottoman, Brepols 2020, pp.259-289.
- Vassa Kontouma, «Londres ou Paris? Les affinités électives de Dosithée II de Jérusalem dans ses premiers projets éditoriaux», in A. Girard, B. Heyberger, V. Kontouma, Livres et confessions chrétiennes orientales. Une histoire connectée entre l'Empire ottoman, le monde slave et l'Occident (XVIe-XVIIIe siècles), Brepols 2023, pp.271-312.
- Klaus-Peter Todt, «Dositheos II. von Jerusalem», in C.G. Conticello, V. Conticello, La Théologie byzantine et sa tradition, II, Brepols 2002, pp.659-720.

Religious titles
Preceded by Nectarius	Orthodox Patriarch of Jerusalem; 1669–1707	Succeeded by Chrysanthus
