= Nectarius of Jerusalem =

Greek Orthodox Patriarch of Jerusalem from 1661 to 1669

His Beatitude Nectarius
- Patriarch of Jerusalem
- Church: Greek Orthodox Church of Jerusalem
- See: Jerusalem
- Installed: April 9, 1661
- Term ended: 1669
- Predecessor: Paiseus
- Successor: Dositheos II

Personal details
- Born: Nikolaos Pelopidis; 1602 Heraklion, Crete
- Died: July 14, 1676 (aged 73–74)

Nectarius of Jerusalem, born Nikolaos Pelopidis (Ancient Greek: Νεκτάριος Πελοπίδης, 1602–1676), was the Greek Orthodox Patriarch of Jerusalem from 1661 to 1669.

== Biography ==
Patriarch Nectarius was born Nikolaos Pelopidis near Heraklion in Crete in 1602. He was educated by the monks of Saint Catherine's Monastery, who were operating the Sinaitic Academy in Herakleion at that time, eventually becoming a monk himself in Sinai.

About 1645 he studied at Athens with the Neo-Aristotelian philosopher and scholar Theophilos Corydalleus.

Early in 1661 he was in Constantinople on business connected with his monastery, and on his return to Sinai he was chosen abbot (25-1-1661). However, on his way to Jerusalem to be consecrated, he was informed that he had been chosen Patriarch of the Holy City, and was consecrated on April 9, 1661.

As he was fond of learning and of music, he arranged for the establishment of schools in Constantinople, in Arta and Chios. In addition, he repaired the Church of the Holy Sepulchre in Jerusalem, and cared for the reconstruction of monastic houses and guest houses for visitors there.

When he was present in Iași, the capital of Moldavia, he became involved with the issues surrounding Patriarch Nikon of Moscow and all the Rus'. In July 1663, when Pantaleon Ligarid and Archbishop Josef of Astrakhan tried to officially depose Patriarch Nikon from his cathedra, Patriarch Nectarius of Jerusalem protested in 1664 against their intended trial of Patriarch Nikon, because he saw no serious basis for it. He also knew Ligarid well, considering him a rogue.

He is known by his recommendation of the Confessio Orthodoxa of Peter Mogilas (1645), which he endorsed in 1662. (Note: There were four seventeenth-century Confessions: Metrophanes Kritopoulos (1625); Cyril Loukaris (1629); Peter Mogila (1645); and; Dositheos of Jerusalem (1672).)

As early as 1666 he sought to be relieved of his duties, and by 1669 Dositheos Notaras had become his successor.

He participated in the Synod of Jerusalem in 1672, that refuted the Calvinist confessions of Cyril Lucaris.

After his resignation, Nectarius remained in Jerusalem, except for a short time when he was driven to Mount Sinai by Latin monks who came to Palestine with Roman Catholic crusaders. Later he remained at the Monastery of The Holy Archangels (Andromedos, Joppa) until his death. Saint Raphael Hawaweeny states that Nectarius was "a righteous person in mind and soul" and so chose to retire due to "fierce resistance of the Jerusalemite monks when he declined to persecute the indigenous Orthodox".

Patriarch Nectarius died on July 14, 1676.

=== Writings ===
Patriarch Nectarius was versed in the Greek, Arabic, Turkish, and Latin languages.

During his patriarchate, Romish emissaries were very active in endeavoring to persuade the Greek Christians of Palestine, suffering under the yoke of the Turks, to unite with the Church of Rome. Among them a Franciscan, named Peter, was especially active in distributing five tracts in defense of the papal authority. Nectarius' refutation of these tracts regarding papal supremacy was among the most important of his writings, in a publication entitled: (in Greek) Κατά τῆς ἀρχῆς τοῦ Παπᾶ, (Note: (in Greek) Περί τῆς ἀρχῆς τοῦ Παπᾶ ἀντιρρήσεις. Iassi 1682; London 1702; Paris 1718.) a firm refutation of the Roman Catholic theses.

He also wrote a work in Greek against the doctrines of Luther and Calvin, which was translated into Latin by Renaudot, who published it, together with Gennadius' Homilies on the Eucharist. In his doctrine of the Eucharist, Nectarius was strictly Orthodox, and a zealous opponent of Cyril Lucaris and the Calvinistic movement.

In addition, Nectarius is said to have written a history of the Egyptian empire down to Sultan Selim. (Note: See Fabricius, Bibliotheca Graeca (ed. Harless), ix, 310.) In this Arabic manuscript (which he composed in Greek), he states that he personally witnessed a miracle in the region of Heliopolis, Egypt, similar to the narrative of The Valley of Dry Bones, (Ezekiel 37:1-14) in which the prophet sees the dead rise again. (Note: "In the region of Heliopolis, Egypt, where the great pyramids are, God performs the following strange paradox every year, to wit: on the evening of our (not the Latins') Holy Thursday, the earth vomits old human relics and bones, which cover the ground of an extensive plain and which remain standing until the following Thursday of the Assumption (misnamed "Ascension" by the Latins), and then they go into hiding, and no longer show themselves at all, until Holy Thursday comes again. This is no myth or fable, but is true and certain, having been verified by older and recent historians, and particularly by George Coressios the Chian, and by Nectarius, of blessed memory, a former patriarch of Jerusalem, who in the Arabic manuscript which he composed tells about it on page 266 and, as appears from what he says further on, saw it with his own eyes. In fact, these human bones presage the future resurrection of the dead, just as the prophet Ezekiel too saw them.")

== Sources ==
- Kattenbusch, Ferdinand (Ph.D, Th.D.). "NECTARIUS: Patriarch of Jerusalem." In: Jackson, Samuel Macauley, Ed. (1914). New Schaff-Herzog Encyclopedia of Religious Knowledge, Vol. VIII: Morality - Petersen. Grand Rapids, Michigan: Baker Book House, 1953. p. 98.
- Proeschel, J.N. "2. Nectarius (Patriarch of Jerusalem)." In: McClintock, John and James Strong. Cyclopaedia of Biblical, Theological and Ecclesiastical Literature. Vol. VI ‒ ME-NEV. New York: Harper and Brother Publishers, 1882. p. 914.
- (in Greek) Μανούσακας Μ. Ι.. Η Επιτομή της Ιεροκοσμικής Ιστορίας του Νεκταρίου Ιεροσολύμων και αι πηγαί αυτής. Κρητικά Χρονικά. τομ.1 (1947), σελ. 291–332.
- (in Latin) Fabricius, Johann Albert. Ioannis Alberti Fabricii... Bibliotheca Graeca: Sive Notitia Scriptorum Vetervm Graecorvm. Editio Nova: Gottlieb Christoph Harless, Christoph August Heumann. Volvmen Nonvm. Hambvrgi: Apud Carolvm Ernestvm Bohn, 1804. p. 310.

Religious titles
Preceded by Paiseus	Orthodox Patriarch of Jerusalem; 1661–1669	Succeeded by Dositheos II
