= Parthenius II of Constantinople =

Ecumenical Patriarch of Constantinople from 1644 to 1646 and from 1648 to 1651

- Ecumenical Patriarch of Constantinople
- Church: Church of Constantinople
- In office: 8 September 1644 – 16 November 1646; 29 October 1648 – 16 May 1651
- Predecessor: Parthenius I of Constantinople; Joannicius II of Constantinople
- Successor: Joannicius II of Constantinople; Joannicius II of Constantinople

Personal details
- Died: 16 May 1651
- Denomination: Eastern Orthodoxy

Parthenius II of Constantinople (Greek: Παρθένιος; died 16 May 1651) was Ecumenical Patriarch of Constantinople for two periods (1644–1646, 1648–1651).

Kallistos Ware relates that Parthenius II, before becoming Patriarch, wrote to Pope Urban VIII in 1640: "To your Beatitude I render all due obedience and submission, acknowledging you to be the true successor of the leader of the Apostles, and the chief shepherd of the Catholic Church throughout the whole world. With all piety and obedience, I bow before your holy feet and kiss them, asking your blessing, for with full power you guide and tend the whole of Christ's chosen flock. So I confess and so I believe, and I am zealous that my subjects also should be such as I am myself. Finding them eager, I guide them in the ways of piety; for there are not a few who think just as I do".

He was a partisan of Cyril I of Constantinople.

== Notes and references ==
Eastern Orthodox Church titles
Preceded by Parthenius I	Ecumenical Patriarch of Constantinople; 1644 – 1646	Succeeded by Joannicius II
Preceded by Joannicius II	Ecumenical Patriarch of Constantinople; 1648 – 1651	Succeeded by Joannicius II (2)
