= Paisius I of Constantinople =

Ecumenical Patriarch of Constantinople from 1652 to 1653 and from 1654 to 1655

- Ecumenical Patriarch of Constantinople
- Church: Church of Constantinople
- In office: July 1652 – April 1653; March 1654 – March 1655
- Predecessor: Athanasius III of Constantinople; Cyril III of Constantinople
- Successor: Joannicius II of Constantinople; Joannicius II of Constantinople

Personal details
- Born: Lesbos, Greece
- Died: c. 1688
- Denomination: Eastern Orthodoxy

Paisius I of Constantinople (Greek: Παΐσιος; died c. 1688) was a two-time Ecumenical Patriarch of Constantinople (July 1652 – April 1653 and March 1654 – March 1655). He was previously Bishop of Ephesus and Larissa.

== Life ==
Paisius was born at the turn of the seventeenth century but the exact date of his birth is not known. He was from the Greek island of Lesbos. In a time of great turbulence, he was not particularly distinguished. After his second deposition, he established residence on the island of Halki, having received eis zoarkeian (that is, without pastoral obligations) the Metropolis of Ephesus and Cyzicus. The date and place of his death is not known, but he likely died at Halki in the late seventeenth century.

== Bibliography ==
This article incorporates text from Paisius I of Constantinople at OrthodoxWiki which is licensed under the CC-BY-SA and GFDL.

Eastern Orthodox Church titles
Preceded by Athanasius III (2)	Ecumenical Patriarch of Constantinople; 1652 – 1653	Succeeded by Joannicius II (3)
Preceded by Cyril III (2)	Ecumenical Patriarch of Constantinople; 1654 – 1655	Succeeded by Joannicius II (4)
