= Timothy II of Constantinople =

Ecumenical Patriarch of Constantinople from 1612 to 1620

- Ecumenical Patriarch of Constantinople
- Church: Church of Constantinople
- Installed: November 1612
- Term ended: 3 September 1620
- Predecessor: Cyril I of Constantinople
- Successor: Cyril I of Constantinople
- Previous post: Archbishop of Patras

Personal details
- Born: Timothy Marmarinos Bandırma
- Died: 3 September 1620
- Denomination: Eastern Orthodoxy

Timothy II of Constantinople (Greek: Τιμόθεος Μαρμαρηνός; died 3 September 1620) was Ecumenical Patriarch of Constantinople from 1612 to 1620.

== Life ==
Timothy Marmarinos was born in Bandırma, on the southern shore of the Sea of Marmara. On 28 February 1601, he became Metropolis of Patras, an office he maintained till he became Patriarch of Constantinople. After the deposition of Neophytus II of Constantinople in October 1612, the Church of Constantinople was temporally left in the care of Cyril I of Constantinople as locum tenens because of his position as Greek Patriarch of Alexandria. Cyril I was close to being appointed as patriarch but four bishops opposed and obtained the election of Timothy II, one of their own, as Patriarch thanks to a promise to the Ottoman Sultan to increase the annual fee paid by the Patriarchate to 8000 kuruş. Thus after 21 days of interregnum Lucaris gave up and in November 1612 Timothy II became the Patriarch of Constantinople.

Timothy II remained a fierce opponent of Cyril I, whom he forced to retire on Mount Athos. Timothy II obtained an arrest warrant against Cyril I, but the latter fled back to Alexandria in Egypt. Timothy II also denounced Cyril I as a Lutheran.

The reason for Timothy II's opposition to Cyril I did not originate with any alignment with the latter's main enemies, i.e. the Catholics, who opposed Cyril I's pro-Protestant attitude. Timothy II also maintained an anti-Catholic attitude, even if in 1615 he wrote a deferential letter to Pope Paul V.

In 1614 Timothy II rebuilt and expanded the small Church of St. George in the Fanar, that since 1601 had become the See of the Patriarchate.

Timothy II died on 3 September 1620, or in March 1621 according to other sources. At the time rumors spread that he had been poisoned at a dinner given by the Dutch ambassador, a supporter of Cyril I, but no proof exists.

== Notes and references ==
Eastern Orthodox Church titles
Preceded by Cyril I	Ecumenical Patriarch of Constantinople; 1612 – 1620	Succeeded by Cyril I (2)
