= Cyril II of Constantinople =

Three-time Ecumenical Patriarch of Constantinople from 1633 to 1639

- Ecumenical Patriarch of Constantinople
- Church: Church of Constantinople
- In office: 7–11 October 1633; 10 March 1635 – June 1636; 20 June 1638 – late June 1639
- Predecessor: Cyril I of Constantinople; Cyril I of Constantinople; Cyril I of Constantinople
- Successor: Cyril I of Constantinople; Neophytus III of Constantinople; Parthenius I of Constantinople

Personal details
- Died: June 1640
- Denomination: Eastern Orthodoxy

Cyril II of Constantinople (Greek: Κύριλλος Κονταρῆς; died June 1640) was three-time Ecumenical Patriarch of Constantinople (1633, 1635–1636, 1638–1639). He was from Veroia, coming to Constantinople in 1618.

Cyril I's popularity among high clergy made leadership more difficult for Cyril II, who had to contend with their undermining of his authority.

Though recognized as a true Patriarch, he made a Catholic profession of faith.

== Notes and references ==
Preceded by Cyril I (3)	Ecumenical Patriarch of Constantinople; 1633	Succeeded by Cyril I (4)
Preceded by Cyril I (5)	Ecumenical Patriarch of Constantinople; 1635 – 1636	Succeeded by Neophytus III
Preceded by Cyril I (6)	Ecumenical Patriarch of Constantinople; 1638 – 1639	Succeeded by Parthenius I
