= Cyril III of Constantinople =

Ecumenical Patriarch of Constantinople in 1652 and 1654

- Ecumenical Patriarch of Constantinople
- Church: Church of Constantinople
- In office: June 1652 (8 days); March 1654 (14 days)
- Predecessor: Joannicius II of Constantinople; Joannicius II of Constantinople
- Successor: Athanasius III of Constantinople; Paisius I of Constantinople

Personal details
- Died: After 1655
- Denomination: Eastern Orthodoxy

Cyril III of Constantinople (Greek: Κύριλλος; died after 1655), was the Ecumenical Patriarch of Constantinople for eight days in June 1652 and again for fourteen days in March 1654. He hailed from Xanthi and had previously served as metropolitan bishop of Corinth, Philippopolis and Tarnovo.

== Notes and references ==
Eastern Orthodox Church titles
Preceded by Joannicius II (2)	Ecumenical Patriarch of Constantinople; 1652	Succeeded by Athanasius III
Preceded by Joannicius II (3)	Ecumenical Patriarch of Constantinople; 1654	Succeeded by Paisius I (2)
