= Parthenius I of Constantinople =

Ecumenical Patriarch of Constantinople from 1639 to 1644

- Ecumenical Patriarch of Constantinople
- Church: Church of Constantinople
- In office: 1 July 1639 – 8 September 1644
- Predecessor: Cyril II of Constantinople
- Successor: Parthenius II of Constantinople

Personal details
- Died: 8 September 1646
- Denomination: Eastern Orthodoxy

Parthenius I of Constantinople (Greek: Παρθένιος; died 8 September 1646) was the Ecumenical Patriarch of Constantinople of the Church of Constantinople from 1 July 1639 to 8 September 1644. Parthenius I was patriarch during a period of frequent changes of the occupant of the cathedra of Constantinople under the Ottoman Sultan. He only served one period.

== Dispute with Nicephorus of Alexandria ==
In a dispute with Patriarch Nicephorus of Alexandria, Parthenius I sided with the hierarchs of the Church of Sinai by granting them permission to perform religious services in Cairo when Nicephorus was visiting Moldovlachia. After Nicephorus was back in Alexandria, his protests made Parthenius I revoke his permission. Still, the tensions over this issue continued between the two Churches.

== Synods ==
In the year 1641, Parthenius I summoned a synod at Constantinople, at which eight prelates and four dignitaries of the church were present. In this synod, the term Transubstantiation is said to have been authorised. In the next year, Parthenius I organized the more important Synod of Iași. The purpose of this assembly was to counter certain Catholic and Protestant doctrinal errors which had infiltrated Orthodox theology and to offer a comprehensive Orthodox statement on the truth of faith.

== Bibliography ==
This article incorporates text from Parthenius I of Constantinople at OrthodoxWiki which is licensed under the CC-BY-SA and GFDL.

Eastern Orthodox Church titles
Preceded by Cyril II (3)	Ecumenical Patriarch of Constantinople; 1639 – 1644	Succeeded by Parthenius II
