= Cyril Lucaris =

Six-time Ecumenical Patriarch of Constantinople from 1612 to 1638

Cyril I of Constantinople
- Ecumenical Patriarch of Constantinople
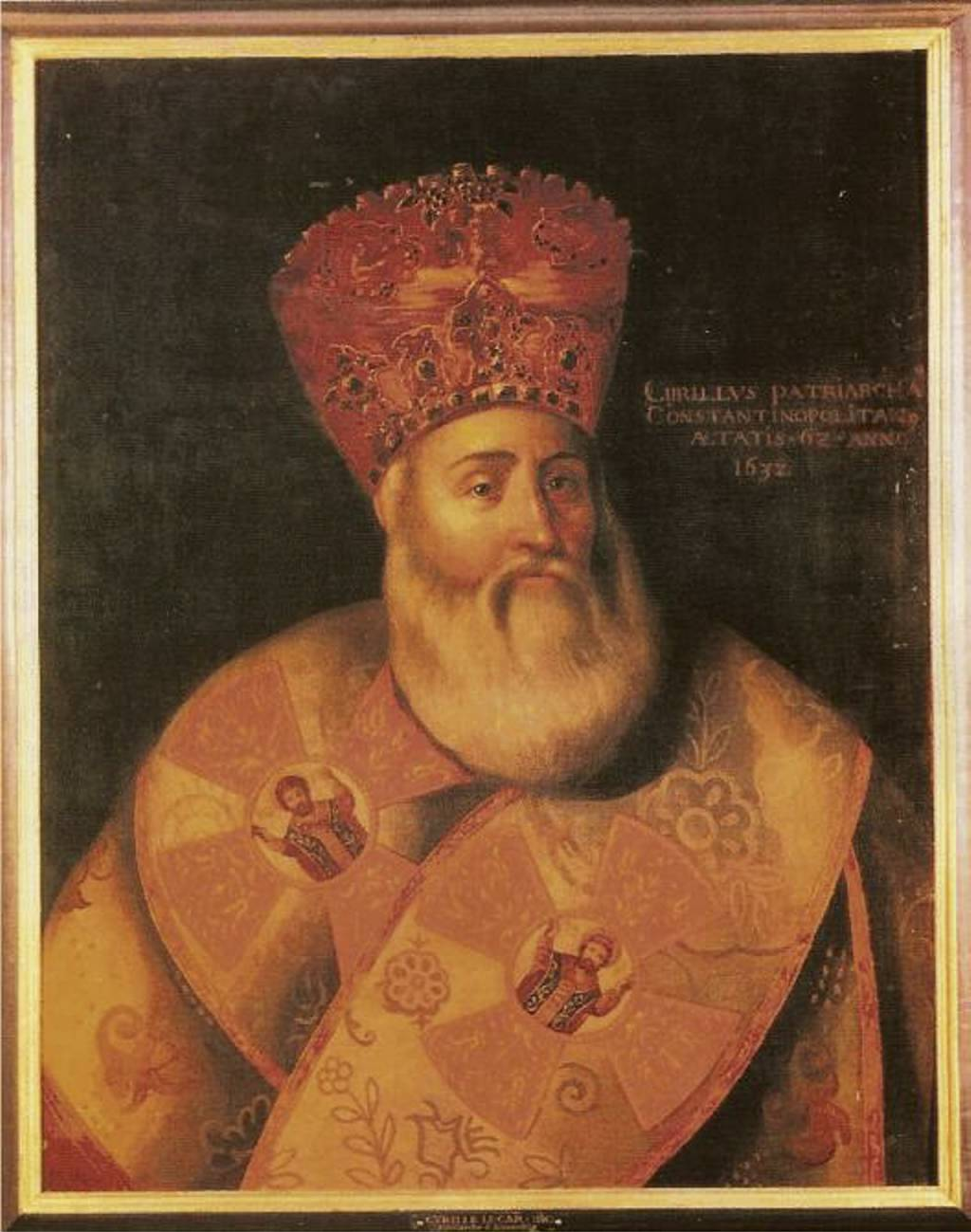
- Cyril I of Constantinople, 1632
- Church: Church of Constantinople
- In office: October 1612 (21 days); 4 November 1620 – 12 April 1623; 22 September 1623 – 4 October 1633; 11 October 1633 – 25 February 1634; April 1634 – March 1635; March 1637 – 20 June 1638
- Predecessor: Neophytus II of Constantinople
- Previous post: Greek Patriarch of Alexandria as Cyril III

Personal details
- Born: 13 November 1572 Heraklion, Crete
- Died: 27 June 1638 (aged 65) Bosporus, Ottoman Empire

Saint Cyril I of Constantinople
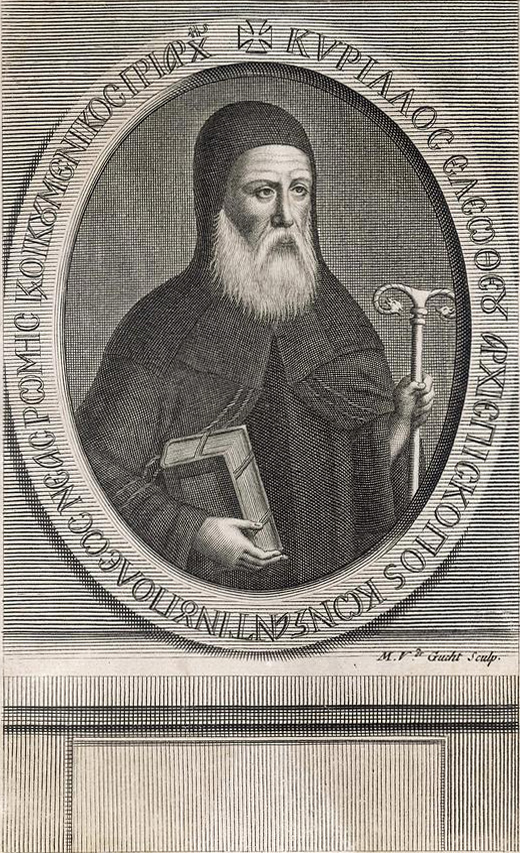
- 17th century depiction of Lucaris

Reformed minister Ecumenical Patriarch of Constantinople Pope and Patriarch of Alexandria Hieromartyr
- Venerated in: Reformed churches, Eastern Orthodox Church
- Canonized: 6 October 2009 by Holy Synod of the Patriarchate of Alexandria, at the Patriarchal Church of Saint Savvas the Sanctified in Alexandria; 11 January 2022 by Ecumenical Patriarchate of Constantinople
- Major shrine: Monastery of Panagia Kamariotissa, Halki
- Feast: 27 June
- Attributes: Eastern episcopal vestments, holding a Gospel Book or a crosier. He is depicted as having a big white beard.

Cyril I of Constantinople (Cyril Lucaris or Kyrillos Loukaris (Greek: Κύριλλος Λούκαρις; 13 November 1572 – 27 June 1638) was a Greek prelate and theologian, and a native of Heraklion, Crete (then under the Republic of Venice). He later became the Greek Patriarch of Alexandria as Cyril III and Ecumenical Patriarch of Constantinople as Cyril I. He has been said to have attempted a reform of the Eastern Orthodox Church along Calvinist Protestant lines. Attempts to bring Calvinism into the Orthodox Church were rejected, and Cyril I's actions, motivations, and specific viewpoints remain a matter of debate among scholars. Cyril I is locally venerated as a hieromartyr in the Alexandrian Orthodox Church; the Holy Synod of the Patriarchate of Alexandria glorified Loukaris on 6 October 2009, and he is commemorated on 27 June.

== Life ==
=== Early life and education ===
Cyril Lucaris was born in Candia (Heraklion), Kingdom of Candia on 13 November 1572, when the island was part of the Republic of Venice's Stato da Mar. In his youth, he travelled through Europe, studying at Venice and the University of Padua, and at Geneva where he came under the influence of Calvinism and the Reformed faith. Lucaris pursued theological studies in Venice and Padua, Wittenberg and Geneva where he developed greater antipathy for Roman Catholicism. Probably, during that time he was the Rector of Ostroh Academy.

=== Ordination and patriarchate ===
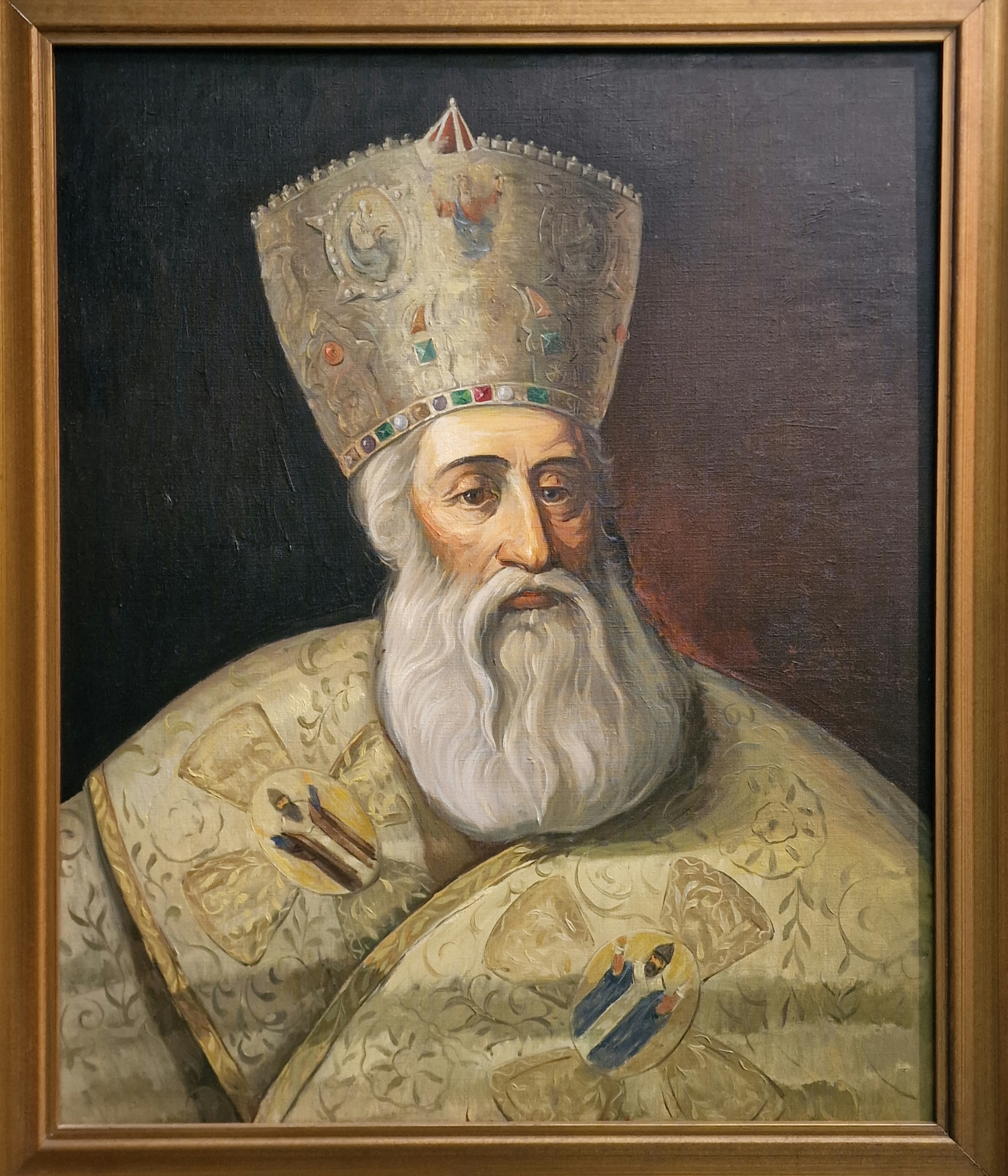
Contemporary portrait of Cyril from the Athens War Museum

While the exact date is unknown, Cyril Lucaris was ordained in Constantinople. In 1596 Lucaris was sent to the Polish–Lithuanian Commonwealth by Meletius I of Constantinople, patriarch of Alexandria, to lead the Orthodox opposition to the Union of Brest, which proposed a union of Kiev with Rome. For six years Lucaris served as professor of the Orthodox academy in Vilnius (now in Lithuania). In 1601, Lucaris was installed as the Patriarch of Alexandria at the age of twenty-nine. He would continue to hold this office for twenty years, until his elevation to the Ecumenical Patriarchate of Constantinople. During these years, Cyril I adopted a theology which was heavily influenced by Protestant Reformation doctrine. On 6 September, he wrote a letter to Marco Antonio de Dominis, a former Roman Catholic Archbishop, writing:

There was a time when we were bewitched before we understood the very pure Word of God; and although we did not communicate with the Roman Pontiff... we abominated the doctrine of the Reformed Churches, as opposed to the Faith, not knowing in good truth what we abominated. But when it pleased the merciful God to enlighten us and make us perceive our former error, we began to consider what our future stand should be. And as the role of a good citizen, in the case of any dissension, is to defend the juster cause, I think it all the more to be the duty of a good Christian not to dissimulate his sentiments in matters pertaining to salvation, but to embrace unreservedly that side which is most accordant to the Word of God. What did I do then? Having obtained, through the kindness of friends, some writings of Evangelical theologians, books which have not only been unseen in the East, but due to the influence of the censures of Rome, have not even been heard of, I then invoked earnestly the assistance of the Holy Ghost, and for three years compared the doctrines of the Greek and Latin Churches with that of the Reformed... Leaving the Fathers I took for my only guide the Scriptures and the Analogy of Faith. At length, having been convinced, through the grace of God, that the cause of the Reformers was more correct and more in accord with the doctrine of Christ, I embraced it.

Due to Turkish oppression combined with the proselytization of the Orthodox faithful by Jesuit missionaries, there was a shortage of schools which taught the Orthodox Faith and the Greek language. Roman Catholic schools were set up and Catholic churches were built next to Orthodox ones, and since Orthodox priests were in short supply something had to be done. His first act was to found a theological seminary in Mount Athos, the Athoniada school.

In 1627, he authorised the establishment of a Greek language printing press in Constantinople, the first of its kind. However, the French government lodged an official protest with Ottoman authorities once the press began to publish anti-Catholic polemics, and as a result, Ottoman authorities ordered its closure one year later.

He sponsored Maximos of Gallipoli to produce the first translation of the New Testament in Modern Greek.

== Calvinism ==
Cyril I's aim was to reform the Eastern Orthodox Church along Calvinistic lines, and to this end he sent many young Greek theologians to the universities of Switzerland, the northern Netherlands and England. In 1629 he published his famous Confessio (Calvinistic doctrine), but as far as possible accommodated to the language and creeds of the Orthodox Church. It appeared the same year in two Latin editions, four French, one German and one English, and in the Eastern Church it started a controversy which brought critics at several synods, in 1638 at Constantinople, in 1642 at the Synod of Iași and culminated in 1672 with the convocation by Dositheus II of Jerusalem, Patriarch of Jerusalem, of the Synod of Jerusalem, by which the Calvinistic doctrines were condemned.

Cyril I was also particularly well disposed towards the Church of England, and corresponded with the Archbishops of Canterbury. It was in his time that Metrophanes Kritopoulos – later to become Patriarch of Alexandria (1636–1639) – was sent to England to study. Both Cyril I and Metrophanes Kritopoulos were lovers of books and manuscripts, and many of the items in the collections of books and these two Patriarchs acquired manuscripts that today adorn the Patriarchal Library.

In 1629 in Geneva the Eastern Confession of the Christian Faith was published in Latin, containing the Calvinist doctrine. In 1633 it was published in Greek. The Council of Constantinople in 1638 anathematised both Cyril I and the Eastern Confession of the Christian Faith, but the Synod of Jerusalem in 1672, specially engaged in the case of Cyril I, completely acquitted him, testified that the Council of Constantinople cursed Cyril I not because they thought he was the author of the confession, but for the fact that Cyril I hadn't written a rebuttal to this essay attributed to him.

The overwhelming majority of Greek and Russian Orthodox scholars (Ivan Malyshevsky, bishop Arsenius Bryantsev, Vasily Malakhov, George Michaelides, Nikolay Talberg) have denied the authenticity of the "Confessio", which resulted in the canonisation of Cyril I in 2009 by the Greek Orthodox Patriarchate of Alexandria, and on 11 January 2022 by the Ecumenical Patriarch of Constantinople.

Nevertheless, some scholars argue that the Confession was the work of Lucaris, noting "the evidence that (the Confession) is his is overwhelming. There is an extant manuscript that is clearly in Cyril I's handwriting. The language used echoes that of his other writings. We have multiple records of his having admitted it to be his, and none of his denial of it, nor of any effort to counter it".

== Politics and death ==
Cyril I was several times temporarily deposed and banished at the instigation of both his Orthodox opponents and the French and Austrian ambassadors, while he was supported by the Protestant Dutch and English ambassadors to the Ottoman capital. Finally, when the Ottoman Sultan Murad IV was about to set out for the Persian War, the Patriarch was accused of a design to stir up the Cossacks, and to avoid trouble during his absence the Sultan had him strangled by the Janissaries on 27 June 1638 aboard a ship in the Bosporus. His body was thrown into the sea, but it was recovered and buried in Nicomedia. His body was brought back to Constantinople after many years.

Cyril I was honoured as a saint and martyr shortly after his death, and Eugenios of Aitolia compiled an Acolouthia (service) to celebrate his memory.

According to a 1659 letter to Thomas Greaves from Edward Pococke (who, on his book-hunting travels for archbishop William Laud, had met Lucaris), many of the choicest manuscripts from Cyril I's library were saved by the Dutch ambassador who sent them by ship to Holland. Although the ship arrived safely, it sank the next day in a violent storm along with its cargo.

== Bibliography ==
- "Kyrillos III Lucaris (1601–1620)". Greek Orthodox Patriarchate of Alexandria.

Eastern Orthodox Church titles
Preceded by Neophytus II (2)	Ecumenical Patriarch of Constantinople; 1612	Succeeded by Timothy II
Preceded by Timothy II	Ecumenical Patriarch of Constantinople; 1620 – 1623	Succeeded by Gregory IV
Preceded by Anthimus II	Ecumenical Patriarch of Constantinople; 1623 – 1633	Succeeded by Cyril II
Preceded by Cyril II	Ecumenical Patriarch of Constantinople; 1633 – 1634	Succeeded by Athanasius III
Preceded by Athanasius III	Ecumenical Patriarch of Constantinople; 1634 – 1635	Succeeded by Cyril II (2)
Preceded by Neophytus III	Ecumenical Patriarch of Constantinople; 1637 – 1638	Succeeded by Cyril II (3)

Preceded by Meletius I	Greek Patriarch of Alexandria; 1601–1620	Succeeded by Gerasimus I
