= Alexandru B. Știrbei =

Wallachian-Romanian aristocrat, politician, businessman and agriculturalist (1837 –1895)

Alexandru Barbu Știrbei
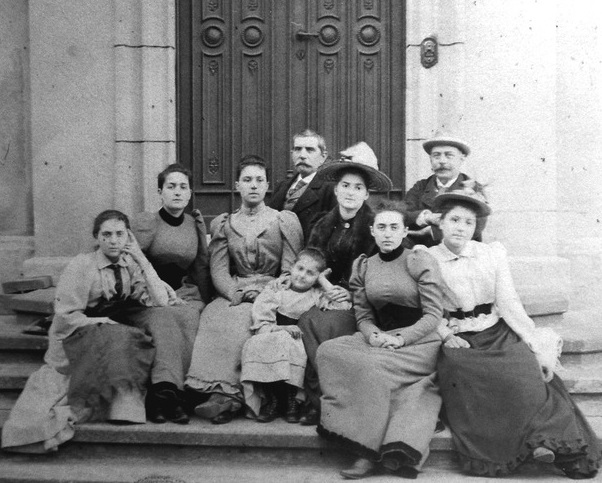
- Știrbei with his seven daughters, on the steps of their palace at Buftea

Conservative Party chairman
- In office November 6, 1881 – November 22, 1881

Romanian Minister of Public Works
- In office March 1888 – November 1888

Romanian Minister of the Interior
- In office November 1888 – March 1889

Romanian Minister of Finance
- In office November 1891 – December 1891

Personal details
- Born: 1837 Bucharest, Wallachia
- Died: March 13, 1895 (aged 57–58) Bucharest, Kingdom of Romania
- Spouse: Maria Ghica-Comănești
- Children: Eliza Brătianu, Barbu Știrbey, and six others
- Parent: Barbu Dimitrie Știrbei (father)
- Relatives: George Barbu Știrbei (brother); Gheorghe Bibescu (uncle); Ioan Emanoil Florescu (brother-in-law); Alexandru Plagino (brother-in-law); Antoine Bibesco (nephew); George Valentin Bibescu (nephew); Consuelo Fould (niece); Georges Achille Fould (niece); Alexandru Marghiloman (son-in-law)
- Profession: Businessman, journalist, soldier

Alexandru Barbu Știrbei, also rendered Alex. Știrbeĭ, Știrbey, or Știrbeiŭ (Francized Alexandre Stirbey; 1837 – March 13, 1895), was a Wallachian-born Romanian aristocrat, politician, businessman and agriculturalist, the son of Barbu Dimitrie Știrbei, Prince of Wallachia, younger brother of George Barbu Știrbei, and nephew of another Prince, Gheorghe Bibescu. After a short career in the French Army, he returned to the United Principalities and served terms in their Assembly of Deputies, inheriting the fortune left by his father. He established pioneering industries around his manorial estates of Buftea and Dărmănești, and became a guest, and sometime host, of literary meetings held by the political club Junimea.

Știrbei's father renounced all claims to the Romanian throne in the 1860s, and his entire family remained loyal to King Carol I. While caucusing with the Junimists, Știrbei also helped establish the Conservative Party, and served as its leader for three weeks in 1881. He was the Romanian Kingdom's Minister of Public Works and Minister of the Interior under Theodor Rosetti (1888–1889); he only served one more term in a cabinet, as Finance Minister under Ioan Emanoil Florescu (1891). Știrbei personally dealt with the ramifications of the Strousberg Affair, which led him to participate in the creation of Romania's railway grid.

He was survived by son Barbu Știrbey, who went on to become Prime Minister of Romania and also continued his work in agriculture; and by daughter Eliza, who married another Prime Minister, Ion I. C. Brătianu. Știrbei was the posthumous grandfather of politician George Cretzianu, of female aviator Marina Știrbei and, allegedly, of Ileana of Romania. The large estate built by Știrbei, and expanded by his children, was dismantled during the communist regime, which also persecuted his descendants. It has been restored since, and continues to be lucrative into the 21st century.

== Biography ==
=== Origins and early life ===
Born in Bucharest, Alexandru was the son of Barbu, the future reigning Prince. As such, he was also the nephew of Prince Barbu's rival brother, Gheorghe Bibescu, cousin of the adventurer Georges Bibesco, and uncle of the aviation pioneer George Valentin Bibescu. As such, he was also the granduncle of writer Anna de Noailles. His other cousin was the poet Alexandru Bibescu, making Știrbei the uncle of diplomat Antoine Bibesco.

At first, the Stirbey family belonged to the low-ranking boyar aristocracy of Oltenia, and more specifically Gorj County, tracing their origins to the yeoman Bibul. Its first influential member had been Alexandru's grandfather, Logothete Dumitrachi Bibescu, whose life coincided with the end of Phanariote rule and the ascendancy of native or assimilated boyars. A protege of Prince Grigore IV Ghica in the 1820s, he married Ecaterina, granddaughter of the boyaress Safta Brâncoveanu and a member of the Văcărescu family. His second son was adopted by a more prestigious Oltenian, the Vornic Barbu C. Știrbei, who left him his name, the estate of Cepturoaia, and vineyards outside Drăgășani. The Bibescu and Știrbei branches remained distinct and competitive, with the two brothers even running against each other in the princely election of 1842—although eventually Barbu ceded Gheorghe his votes. Figures of the establishment looked down on both of them, seeing them as upstarts, equally unprepared for national politics.

In all, Barbu Dimitrie Știrbei had seven children by his Cantacuzino wife, Elisabeta. Alexandru's older brother, George Barbu Știrbei, had a career in the Wallachian military forces and as a diplomatic liaison of his father's. Both he and his father, who had abdicated, won seats as deputies to the ad hoc Divan in the September 1857 race. Following the establishment of the United Principalities, George mounted the opposition to Domnitor Alexandru Ioan Cuza, and, in 1860, was arrested for sedition. A sister, Elena, had married count Leo Larisch von Mönnich from Cieszyn Silesia; in 1855, she gave birth to his son Georg, later husband of the Baroness Wallersee. Other brothers-in-law included General Ioan Emanoil Florescu and politician Alexandru Plagino.

Both Alexandru and his other brother, Dimitrie, were originally chased out of Wallachia by the Crimean War: in November 1853, the country's invasion by Russia forced them to settle in Paris. Alexandru studied at the Military School of Saint-Cyr, but he is also known to have held a degree in the sciences. He secured an officer's rank in the French Army under the Second Empire, before being recalled to Wallachia by his father during the Italian War of 1859, in what was probably at attempt to maintain good relations between Wallachia and the Austrian Empire. This policy was disregarded by the prince's nephew Georges Bibesco, who went on to serve with distinction in the Franco–Mexican War.

=== Entering politics ===
Prince Barbu and his sons were offered a final chance to take the throne over both Principalities, in early 1866. By contrast with Sașa Cuza, all Știrbei and Bibescu princes renounced their vague claims to the throne following the ascendancy of a foreign-born Domnitor, Carol of Hohenzollern. The former Wallachian ruler visited Carol Carol, pledging his and his sons' support. George Știrbei was an enthusiastic follower of the new regime, serving Carol as Foreign Minister. Within a few years, he quit politics, either because of disease or because of feeling snubbed by Carol. Dimitrie Știrbei, also active under the Carol regime, was a diplomatic envoy before trying out a political career in the 1880s.

For his part, Alexandru was inactive during the Cuza and early Carol years, before entering political life with the "White" (conservative) party. In 1867, he began his philanthropic work by joining a famine relief committee, to which his father contributed 10,000 lei. Already in 1866, he had joined the right-wing monarchist committee formed around Ordinea newspaper, but could only register as a voter in early 1868, with the 1st College of Bucharest. Upon his father's death in 1869, and his mother and older brother withdrawing to France, Alexandru inherited the Știrbei residence on Calea Victoriei, and a family domain in Buftea. The latter, purchased by Prince Barbu in 1845, endured as his favorite hangout, where he built himself the eponymous Gothic revival palace. Alexandru married Maria Ghica-Comănești of the Moldavian Ghicas. She brought him as dowry the winery of Dărmănești, which he also turned into a manor, as well as farmlands in Brusturoasa and Mândrești. They had eight children together (two sons and six daughters), including Eliza (born 1870) and Barbu Alexandru (born 1872).

Știrbei family arms

A. B. Știrbei joined the Assembly of Deputies during the 1871–1875 legislature, taking a seat in by-elections for Dolj County (June 1872). Assisting fellow deputy Gheorghe Manu, he tried to solve the Strousberg Affair by reselling railway stock to the Romanian state. Against other colleagues, he did not favor selling more stock to the Englishman George Crawley, noting that the latter lacked credentials. In May 1874, he was a rapporteur on the negotiations with Austria-Hungary, which dealt specifically with opening the Romanian railway grid to the Austrian StEG, through connections in Bolvașnița and Predeal. In this, he pursued a political line that had been set by his brother.

Știrbei also joined a committee of inquiry looking into the activities of Petre Mavrogheni as Minister of Finance and a group investigating allegations of embezzlement by Nicolae C. Brăiloiu, the Mayor of Bucharest. In the elections of July 1874, he was made a steward of Bucharest Commune, seconding Manu and Dimitrie Ghica. Ahead of the legislative election of 1875, Știrbei rallied with Ghica's "Liberal Conservative" faction, which sought to reconcile the "Whites" and the liberal movement. Thereafter, Știrbei focused on his Assembly career. In April 1876, with Petre P. Carp, he gave conditional support to the new Prime Minister Florescu, who, although a conservative and Știrbei's cousin, had been imposed by Domnitor Carol.

In the election of June 1876, Știrbei was one only two conservatives winning seats in the 1st College, again at Dolj—all other seats were taken by a consolidated National Liberal Party. The outgoing "Liberal Conservative" Prime Minister, Lascăr Catargiu, had reportedly undercut Știrbei's ability to win elections without resorting to fraud. The claim was voiced by the National Liberal Anastase Stolojan, who argued that Catargiu had graduated 300 tenant farmers, which he viewed as more malleable, into Dolj's 1st College. This legislature saw Romania entering the Russo-Turkish War, and declaring her independence. In this context, Știrbei, Pantazi Ghica, Petru Grădișteanu, Pache Protopopescu, Dimitrie Sturdza and other deputies advanced moderate backing for the Foreign Minister, Mihail Kogălniceanu, who was drafting a declaration of war on the Ottoman Empire. As the war ended, Știrbei tried to oppose Romania's cession of Southern Bessarabia to Russia, seeing it as an act of betrayal.

He returned to take an Ilfov County seat in 1879, alongside his associate Ghica, in what was a surprise "White"-party victory. In 1880, he was among the founding members of the enlarged Conservative Party, and an editor of the party organ, Timpul—directly supervising its publisher, Mihai Eminescu. In December 1880, as Catargiu became party chairman, Știrbei joined his steering committee, alongside Manu, Florescu, Menelas Ghermani, Alexandru Lahovary, Titu Maiorescu, Grigore Păucescu, Theodor Rosetti, and Grigore Triandafil. In act of reconciliation in 1881, Știrbei presented his homages to the National Liberal Prime Minister, Ion Brătianu, who had survived an assassination attempt by Ion Pietraru; later that year, he voted in favor of establishing the Kingdom of Romania, with Carol as King of Romania.

=== With Junimea ===
In the decade that followed, A. B. Știrbei sought to pacify the Conservatives' rebellious Junimea wing, led by Maiorescu and Petre P. Carp; he himself was seen as consistently in the establishment faction, or as an independent Conservative. On November 6, 1881, with Junimist backing, he became leader of the party, but was toppled on November 22 by the returning Catargiu. He remained a noted guest at Junimea's literary gatherings. During one such event in April 1882, he was one of the few to hear Eminescu reading a draft version of Luceafărul; in October, Maiorescu read the finished work in a special session held at Știrbei's manor in Buftea. He was also in the audience as Alexandru Macedonski recited his "November Night" (March 1882) and Vasile Alecsandri read from his new play, Fântâna Blanduziei (March 1884).

Together with the Junimists, Știrbei made a triumphant return to the Assembly in the electoral sweep of January 1888, although the overall victory was endangered by factional disputes. According to one account, he himself had only joined the opposition after the failure of secret negotiations with Brătianu, who wanted him to become a National Liberal. By March, he was instrumental in forming the "united opposition" which removed Brătianu, replaced by the Junimist Th. Rosetti. He was subsequently Rosetti's Minister of Public Works (March–November 1888) and of Interior (November 1888–March 1889), being again elected at Dolj in October 1888. As Interior Minister, he had to deal with the effects of a peasant revolt that had occurred during the first half of 1888, as well as the first general strike by typographers, which ended by satisfying certain demands by the workers. He was also tasked with solving the issue of Romanian participation in the Paris World Fair, on which issue he was opposed to his cousin Georges Bibesco, who led the National Committee. One contemporary described him as "loyal, hard-working, knowledgeable and precise in his duties". In contrast, George Panu of the Radical Party mocked his "most profound muteness" as a deputy, his only visible "passion" being that of regaining a ministerial seat. This despite him having "all the negative qualities", an "absolute nobody" in politics (if "eminently honorable" in regular life).

Știrbei was eventually removed by the new Conservative Prime Minister, Catargiu, who also purged Junimists from the leading posts. According to Panu, Știrbei was reemerging as a Junimist, albeit one of circumstance, who agreed mainly with the group's Germanophilia. He returned to ministerial office under a later Conservative administration, set up by General Florescu (November–December 1891), when he served as Minister of Finance. He resigned to be replaced by Ghermani, during a reshuffle which let back in Junimea men, although, for a while, he was also tipped as a potential member of the consolidated cabinet. He continued to hold seats in the Assembly and, following the 1892 election, replaced Păucescu as vice president of that chamber.

During this interval, Știrbei involved himself in the proposals for a new railway terminal at Cotroceni. He presided over an architectural jury which favored the project by Alexandre Marcel, despite accusations of plagiarism. In July 1894, alongside Manu, Sturdza, Triandafil, and Constantin C. Arion, he founded the Agricultural Bank. His business activities were focused on Buftea, where he inaugurated a canning plant, twenty orchards, one hundred gardens, and fifty vineyards. By 1898, his property there totaled 2350 hectares (5806 acres), more than half of Buftea's territory. He also spent summers in Dărmănești, where he was neighbors and friends with a fellow Conservative, Radu Rosetti. There, Știrbei and his younger son George set up a business in forestry and wood processing. He owned other estates in Teleorman County, including Elisabeta, which he leased out to A. Anagnistiade.

He doubled this work with contribution as a philanthropist, and had a special connection with his Oltenian constituency seat, Craiova. He supplied scholarships to orphans born in that city, built part of the road to Calafat and sponsored the adjoining railway line; he also erected Jitianu memorial bridge, was ktitor of Holy Trinity Orthodox Church, and donated the plot on which Carol I National College was built. On his Oltenian estates, at Pătulele, Știrbei employed horticulturist Friedrich Grunow, who reforested the area with black locust, which reputedly stopped desertification. From 1888, Știrbei also sought appointment as curator of Așezămintele Brâncovenești, a charity set up by his aunt, Zoe Brâncoveanu, having donated his estate in Cervenia for its use. He shared this position with his cousin Georges. Together, the cousins also managed Brâncovenesc Hospital, setting up a quarantine area for the cholera outbreak of 1893.

=== Death and legacy ===
From 1885, when Maria died in childbirth, Știrbei was raising alone his younger children, including infant Ioana. In 1890, he married off Eliza, to the young Junimist politico and landowner, Alexandru Marghiloman. By February 1895, he was gravely ill. On March 13 (Old Style: March 1) of that year, he died unexpectedly at his Bucharest palace, and, Journal des Débats reports, was "mourned not just by one party, but by the whole country." The Assembly held a minute of silence in his honor. He was buried next to his father and brothers in the crypt of Buftea. The ceremony was lavish, attended by the Crown Prince Ferdinand and by Matei Vlădescu, on behalf of the king, as well as by the Catargiu cabinet and the foreign diplomats. His older brother, who had cut off his links to Romania, survived him by three decades, dying in his nineties as the owner of a château in Bécon-les-Bruyères. A patron of the arts, he had married actress Gustave Haller, adopting in 1888 her daughters Consuelo and Georges Achille Fould, and sponsoring their training as painters. His other brother Dimitrie left a daughter, Martha, who married in 1901 the Austrian officer Hans von Blome, later opening a literary salon in Vienna.

Through his will, Știrbei had made his Junimist friend Ghermani a caretaker of his younger children, with Triandafil as their recommended adviser. Most of his estate was eventually inherited by Barbu Alexandru, who spelled his name as "Știrbey" and was known locally as the "White Prince". He greatly increased the family's wealth with his intensive animal farming, his investment in cash crops, and his takeover of banking concerns, also leasing out the family's Teleorman estates. He enjoyed political influence over the new establishment, campaigning with the Conservatives alongside his brother George (who served for a while in the Assembly for Dolj), but later switching sides. Eliza also divorced Marghiloman and, in 1907, married the National Liberal leader Ion I. C. Brătianu. Their sisters also married into the elite: Zoe to George Cretzianu, Maria (Marieta) to Gheorghe Balș, Adina to General Gheorghe Moruzzi. Zoe died young, in 1896, leaving twins Alexandru and George G. Cretzianu. Ioana, herself a noted philanthropist, was married to officer Radu R. Rosetti in March 1907; she died seven years later, leaving him sole owner of Brusturoasa and Mândrești.

Buftea became a favorite hangout of the Romanian elite from 1909, but Barbu lost Dărmănești to George and his wife, Elisabeta "Lysbeth" Băleanu; they rebuilt it using the architectural talents of Nicolae Ghica-Budești. A curator of the Royal Estates upon Ioan Kalinderu's death, the "White Prince" was famous as the lover of Queen Marie of Romania, and alleged father of Princess Ileana. He also had a friendly relationship with Marie's husband, now King Ferdinand, whom he reportedly convinced to side with the Entente Powers and join forces with them in the war of 1916. The wartime split the brothers Știrbei: before his death from typhus in December 1917, George supported the rogue Conservative faction formed by Marghiloman and Lupu Kostaki, and favored the Central Powers.

Știrbei inheritance
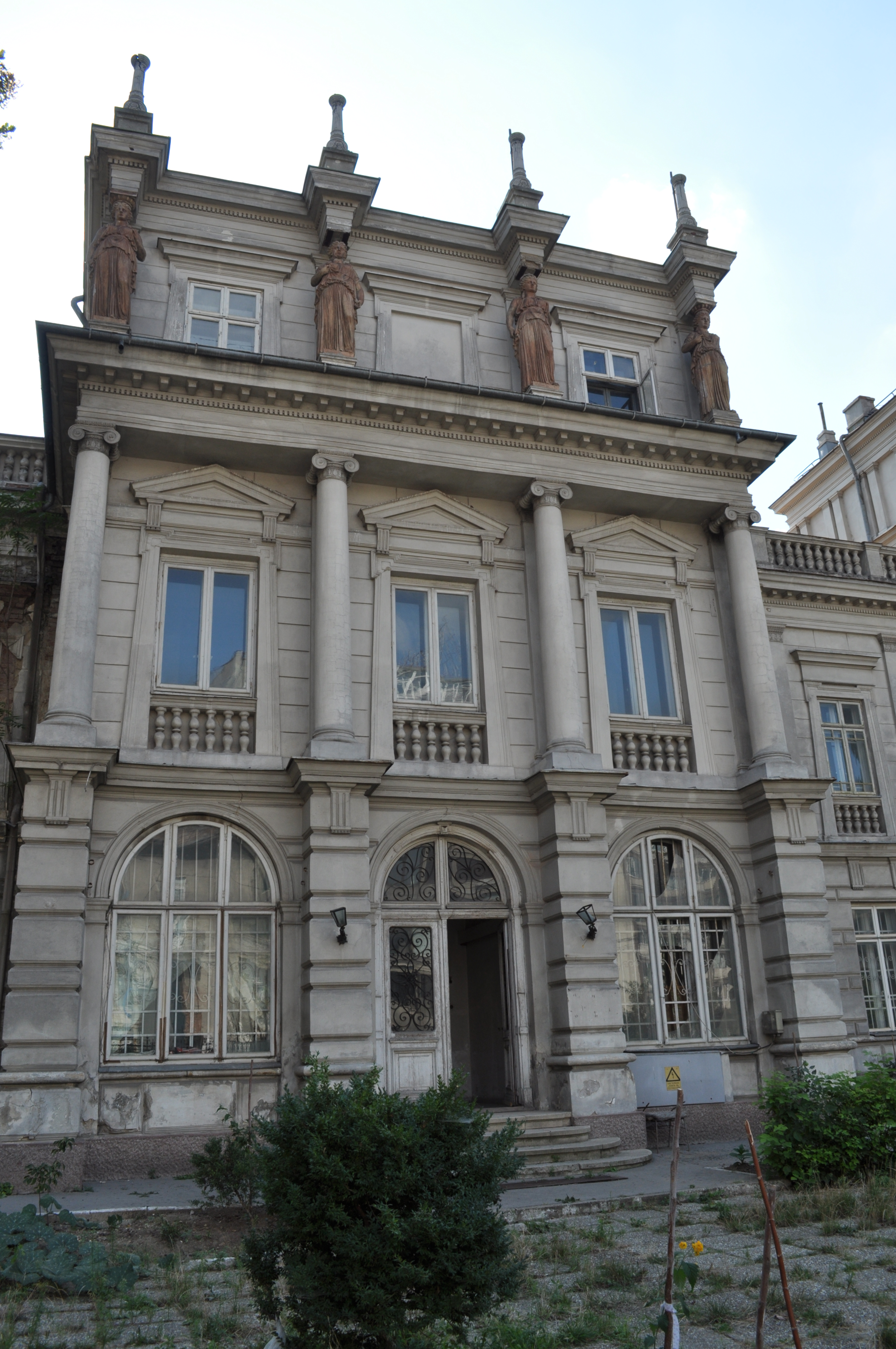
Calea Victoriei palace

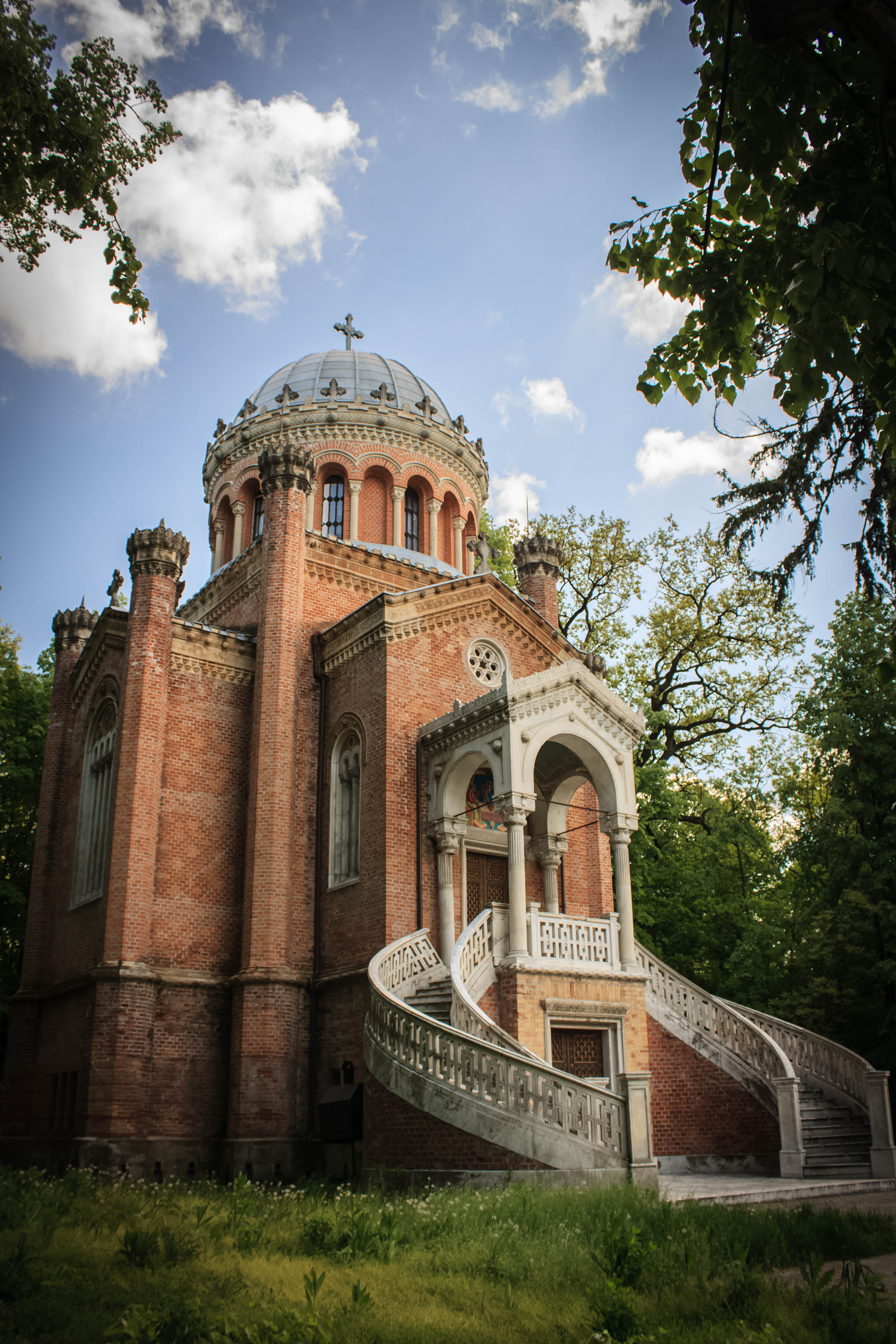
Știrbei Chapel in Buftea

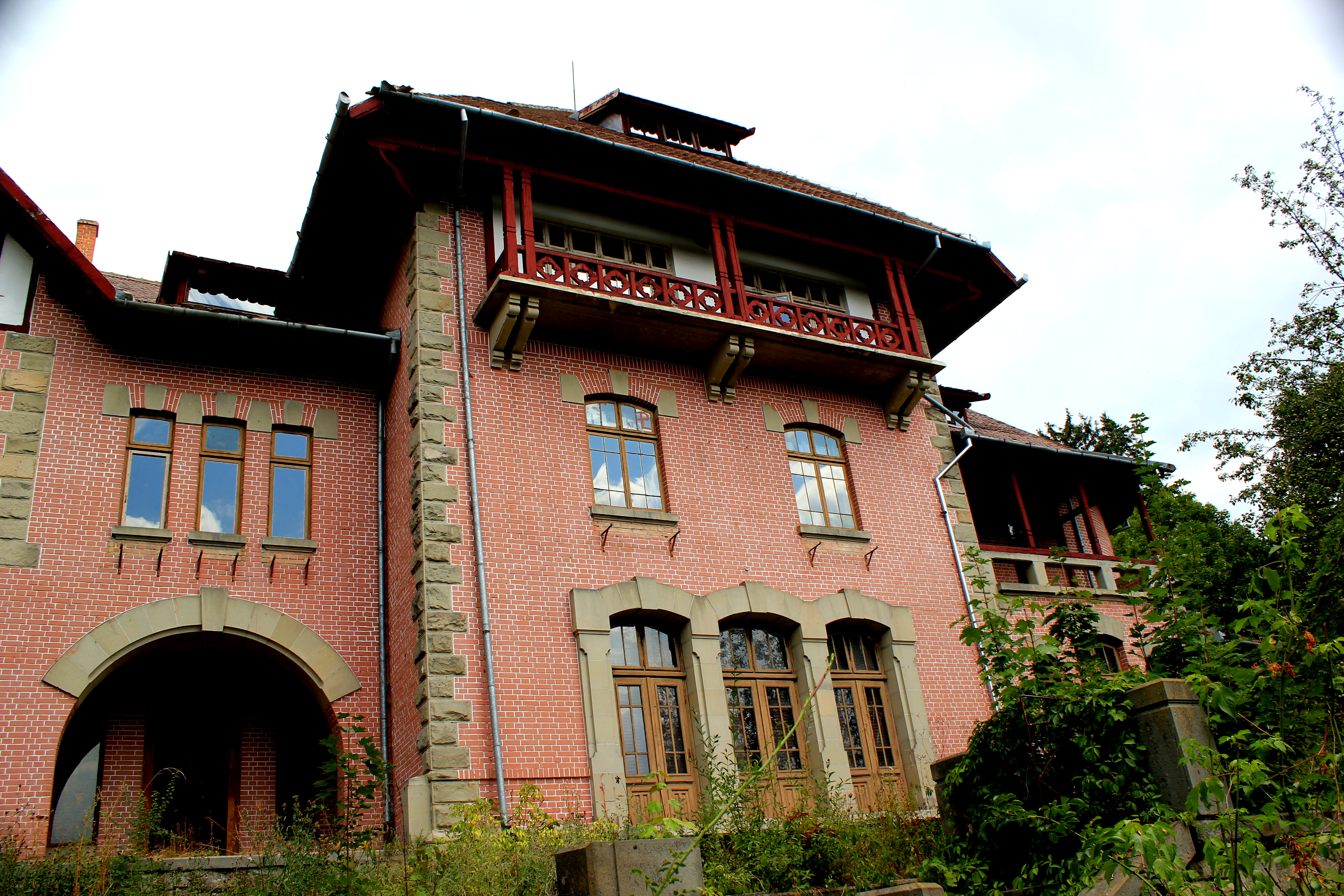
Dărmănești manor

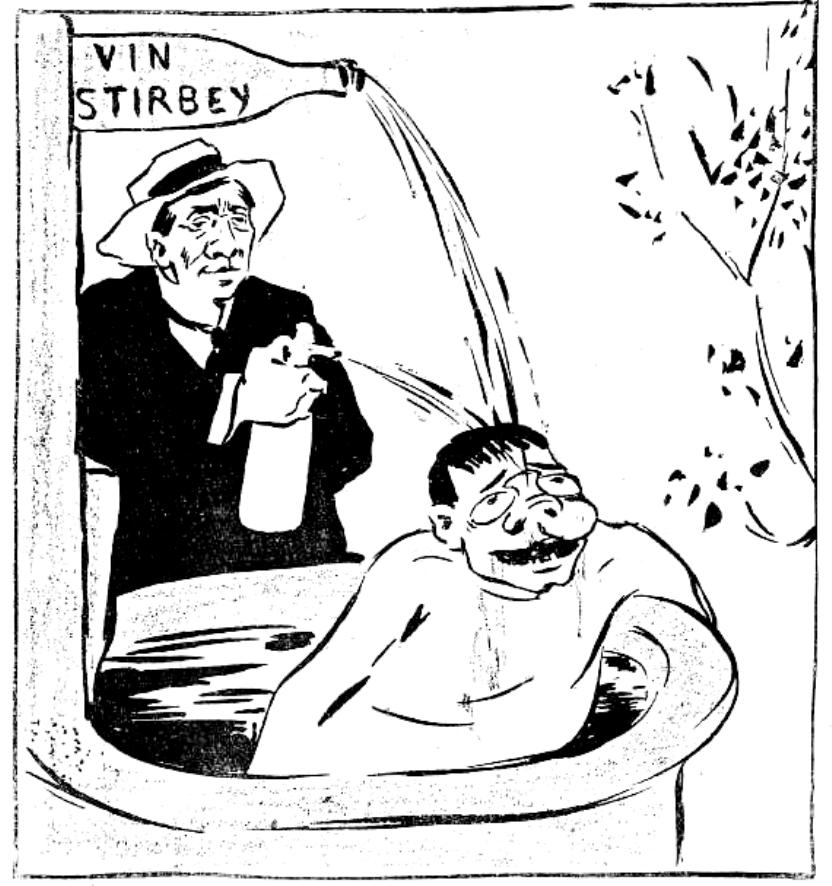
1910 advertisement by Ion Theodorescu-Sion, showing actor Ion Brezeanu bathing in "Știrbey wine"

In January 1927, a moribund Ferdinand appointed the Prince as his Prime Minister, but Știrbey was toppled after only two weeks by Brătianu, who also died that year. His status threatened by the coronation in 1930 of a hostile Carol II, Știrbey lived in exile in France, where he survived an assassination attempt. He returned to his country during World War II. At the time, his nephew George Cretzianu was serving as Minister of Finance of the National Legionary State. In 1944, together with his other nephew Alexandru Cretzianu, the "White Prince" arranged negotiations with the Allied Powers from Egypt. His final work was as an opponent of the Romanian Communist Party, failing in his bid to return as Prime Minister in 1945, before dying, in mysterious circumstances, the following year. Eliza survived to 1957, dying in poverty and seclusion under the communist regime, but finding posthumous fame as a memoirist.

From his marriage to cousin Nadèje Bibescu, the "White Prince" had four daughters, all of whom left Romania before the nationalization of Buftea. His sons-in-law were: historian Șerban Flondor, son of statesman Iancu Flondor; anti-communist politician Grigore Niculescu-Buzești; and Nicolae Costinescu, owner of the Sinaia weapons factory. His and Eliza's niece, Marina Știrbei, who inherited Dărmănești, was a war pilot with the White Squadron, fleeing the country with her children after the arrest of her husband, Constantin Basarab Brâncoveanu. Among the Brusturoasa Rosettis, Ioana's widower, General Rosetti, died a prisoner of the communist regime. Radu Jr, one of four children born to him and Ioana, was similarly persecuted. Dărmănești was also lost to the state, which used it as a sanatorium. The home on Calea Victoriei became a museum of ceramics.

Following the Romanian Revolution of 1989, extensive legal disputes touched Știrbei's various properties. The former museum on Calea Victoriei, heavily damaged by the earthquake of March 1977, was recovered by Ioana, baroness Kripp-Costinescu, who was sole inheritor of the "White Prince", in 2004. It was then controversially resold to a real-estate developer. The Buftea complex, listed by the National Register of Historic Monuments in Romania, was sold and resold to developers, and in 2016 was valued as 20 million euro. In 2011, it became the host of a yearly pop festival, Summer Well. The Kripp branch preserved ownership of the vineyards in Drăgășani, which they turned into a leading producer of Tămâioasă Românească. In 2005, the sons of Marina Știrbei were returned ownership of Dărmănești manor, which they also sold to a private investor.
