= George Barbu Știrbei =

Romanian politician

George Barbu Știrbei (Georges Stirbey)
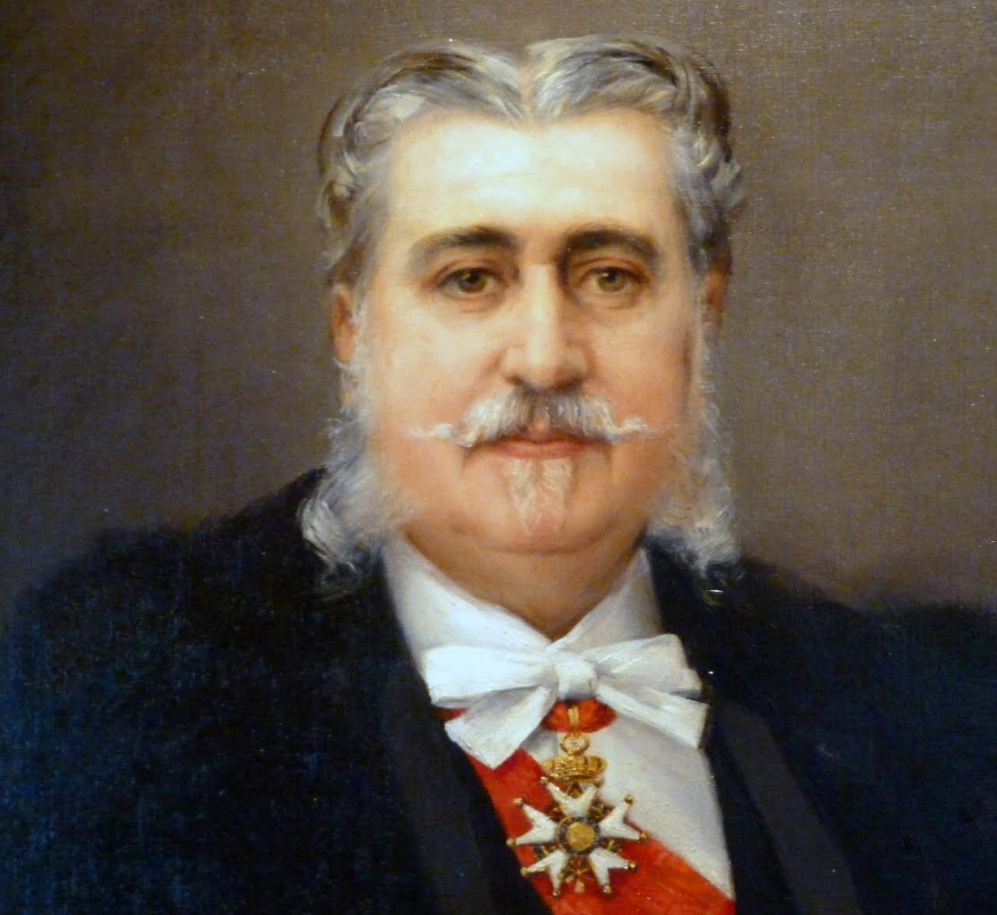
- Portrait of Știrbei by his daughter Georges Achille Fould

Foreign Minister of the Principality of Romania
- In office July 15, 1866 – February 21, 1867
- Monarch: Carol I
- Preceded by: Petre Mavrogheni
- Succeeded by: Ștefan Golescu

Personal details
- Born: April 1, 1828 Bucharest, Wallachia
- Died: August 15, 1925 (aged 97)
- Spouse: Valérie Simonin
- Children: Consuelo Fould; Georges Achille Fould; Georg Schütte Harmsen
- Parent: Barbu Dimitrie Știrbei (father)
- Relatives: Alexandru B. Știrbei (brother); Gheorghe Bibescu (uncle); Ioan Emanoil Florescu (brother-in-law); Alexandru Plagino (brother-in-law); Antoine Bibesco (nephew); George Valentin Bibescu (nephew); Eliza Brătianu (niece); Barbu Știrbey (nephew); Anna de Noailles (grandniece)
- Profession: Soldier, diplomat, businessman, journalist, critic, playwright, biographer

Military service
- Allegiance: Wallachia
- Years of service: 1851–1856
- Rank: General
- Commands: Wallachian militia
- Battles/wars: Crimean War

George Barbu Știrbei or Știrbeiŭ, also known as Gheorghe, Georgie, or Iorgu Știrbei (transitional Cyrillic: George Stirbeiꙋ̆; Francized Georges Stirbey; April 1, 1828 – August 15, 1925), was a Wallachian-born Romanian aristocrat and politician who served as the Minister of Foreign Affairs from July 15, 1866, until February 21, 1867. He was the eldest son of Barbu Dimitrie Știrbei, Prince of Wallachia, and the nephew of his rival, Gheorghe Bibescu; his younger siblings included the landowner and industrialist Alexandru B. Știrbei. Educated in France, he returned to Wallachia during his father's princely mandate, as a Beizadea and aspiring politician. Fleeing his country during the Crimean War, he served the French Empire before returning home to become Wallachian Minister of War and Spatharios. He is remembered for reforming the Wallachian militia during the remainder of Prince Barbu's term.

Știrbei remained a legislator of Wallachia and then of the United Principalities; his core constituency was Dolj County, though his legitimacy there was disputed by allegations of fraud. He was however strongly opposed to the Principalities' first Domnitor, Alexandru Ioan Cuza, reemerging by 1860 as a charismatic leader of the conservative opposition. His involvement in political scandals and electoral intrigues led to his brief arrest that same year, but Cuza was ultimately toppled in 1866. Following this, Știrbei abandoned his own bid for the throne to serve Domnitor Carol of Hohenzollern. As Foreign Minister, he helped secure recognition for the United Principalities, and made diplomatic overtures toward Austria-Hungary. Failing in his attempt to become Prime Minister of Romania, he was disappointed with the Domnitor, leaving politics altogether.

Știrbei divided the second half of his life between homes in Paris and Bécon-les-Bruyères, and was naturalized French. In this period, he was a collector and patron of the arts, noted as Jean-Baptiste Carpeaux's last sponsor. He was also married to the actress and sculptor Valérie Simonin, adopting her daughters Consuelo and Georges Achille Fould—whom he educated artistically. His parallel work was as a cultural journalist, and, late in his life, as the posthumous editor of Jean-Jacques Weiss and as a memoirist. His controversial dealings with Carpeaux, the status of his inheritance, and his paternity disputes remained at the center of public attention long after his death.

== Biography ==
=== Origins and early life ===
Știrbei was born in Bucharest, the Wallachian capital, on April 1, 1828, a date he himself gave against records which have 1834; other sources claim 1832. His paternal origins were in the Bibescu family, which had its roots in the petty boyar nobility of Oltenia: a yeoman Bibul, living before 1700, was the family patriarch. The clan went through a rapid social climb after the fall of the Phanariotes and the foundation of a Regulamentul Organic regime. As a protege of Prince Grigore IV Ghica in the 1820s, George's grandfather Dumitrachi married Ecaterina, a member of the Văcărescu family, and made friends with her tutor, Vornic Barbu C. Știrbei. He was a godfather to Dumitrachi's first-born, Barbu Bibescu, whom he adopted, before dying in 1813; Barbu was therefore the only one known as Știrbei among the three Bibescu brothers. On his mother Elisabeta's side, George descended from the Cantacuzino family, specifically its branch in Moldavia.

When his son was born, Barbu Bibescu-Știrbei was merely a Clucer, trailing behind his more ambitious brother Gheorghe; his climb was moreover interrupted by the Russian Empire, with its invasion of Wallachia. It resumed when he was imposed by Consul Peter I. Rikman into the cabinet of Prince Alexandru II Ghica. The liberal-minded and Westernizing Pavel Kiselyov become governor of the two Danubian Principalities, also forcing Știrbei's appointment to government offices. As reported by French expatriate Félix Colson, in the 1830s the family was already proudly Bonapartist in their politics. Their public commitment to Kiselyov prompted the Wallachian establishment to regard the Bibescu–Știrbeis as intolerable upstarts—or "Oltenian horse-breeders", in the reported sayings of Alecu Filipescu-Vulpea. Other critics jokingly referred to the brothers as the "equine dynasty".

During those years, Barbu fathered six more children by Elisabeta: sons Alexandru and Dimitrie, daughters Fenereta, Alina, Elisabeta, and Elena. When George turned 12 in 1840, his father dispatched him to the Kingdom of France, where he enlisted at the Bollin school, then at Lycée Louis-le-Grand. During his time at Louis-le-Grand, young Știrbei met and befriended the future writer-politician Jean-Jacques Weiss, becoming his admirer and, later, his biographer and editor. Taking his Baccalauréat in August 1847, he studied in parallel at the Administrative School, Collège de France, and the Paris Law Faculty. His graduation from the latter came in August 1850, when he published with Firmin Didot his thesis De Condictione indebite ou Des obligations qui se forment sans contrat. He witnessed the French Revolution of 1848, and in later years emphasized its positive qualities in disputes with the more conservative politicians. This period of Știrbei's life also overlapped with a Wallachian Revolution, which toppled his uncle Bibescu from the throne. Having conceded the 1842 election to his brother, Barbu Știrbei accepted government office, but maintained his independence. He had been sidelined by the time of the revolt, keeping silent during its outbreak. However, as noted by his son, he privately resented it as an experiment in socialism.

Following interventions by Russia and the Ottoman Empire, Barbu Știrbei was made Prince and George became the Beizadea. Returning to Bucharest, he was incorporated as a Major into the Wallachian military forces and joined the Prince on official duties, including on his 1851 visit to Telega; he was dispatched on official trips to Saint Petersburg, Hermannstadt, and Istanbul. In Russia, he was expected to manage a diplomatic incident, prompted by his father's passing reference to "foreign interference" in Wallachia's affairs. His later writings reveal his dislike for the salons of Russia and for his liege, Nicolas I, whom he likened to the ancient Kings of Assyria. Noted as a "great lover of theater and invaluable supporter of the actors", "especially fond" of the comedian Costache Caragiale, he was present with his father for the inauguration of Caragiale's Bucharest Theater (late 1852).

During late 1851 George joined his father's government, replacing Postelnic Ioan Manu, who was taking a sick leave. During that interval, his sister Elena married count Leo Larisch von Mönnich from Cieszyn Silesia; George and his mother sailed to Vienna to attend the wedding. In 1855, Elena gave birth to his son Georg Larisch, later husband of the Baroness Wallersee. By then, George had ascended to more permanent offices in the administration: in 1853, he was Logothete of the Justice Ministry. The cabinet also included Alexandru Plagino, who was brothers-in-law with the Beizadea; later, his brothers-in-law included Ioan Emanoil Florescu.

=== War Minister ===
A new Russian intervention came in summer 1853, during the escalation ahead of the Crimean War. At the time, Beizadea George was a Colonel attached to the General Staff. Alongside his father, he paid homage to Mikhail Dmitrievich Gorchakov, an effective surrender. He was eventually chased out of the country by the unfolding events (as were his younger brothers), and returned to Paris, where he applied for service in the French Army. Attached as a foreigner, he was stationed with the Versailles cavalry, and became Pierre Chrétien Korte's aide de camp. He spent the war negotiating with the Second French Empire and the Ottomans on behalf of his father, carefully balancing the interests of both powers. As he reported later in life, the Wallachians tacitly supported France; for this reason, young Știrbei was promised command of a "small army corps" attached to the Royal Sardinian Army.

Russia's defeat restored his father to the throne, allowing Știrbei to be decommissioned and to return home; Wallachia and Moldavia had by then been placed under international supervision, ending Regulamentul Organic. The new tutelage of the country involved not only the Ottomans and the Russians, but also France, the Austrian Empire, Great Britain, the Kingdom of Prussia, and Piedmont-Sardinia. From Bucharest, George Știrbei left on new diplomatic tours, visiting Moldavia and approaching its Prince, Grigore Alexandru Ghica; he also had contacts with Austria through Count Coronini. He presented the latter with a paper, Resumé de la situation administrative de Valachie, which became useful for the Western powers in evaluating the course of Wallachian affairs.

Beizadea Știrbei was eventually sent to France with orders to complete his military education there. He is known to have taken courses at both the Prussian Military Academy and the Military School of Saint-Cyr, following which he became a Wallachian general and Minister of War (Spatharios), taking over in March 1855. This position allowed him influence over the political and social life. His art collection probably dates back to this period, when painter Theodor Aman, whom the Știrbeis elevated to the rank of Pitar, sent him one of his canvasses as thanks. Possibly pressed on by the Moldavian precedent, from December 1855 the Beizadea and fellow minister Plagino also recommended to Prince Barbu that he liberate Wallachia's Romani slaves. As noted by his subordinate Dimitrie Papazoglu, his reformist stance "won him affection from the entire army." His work also included teaching history to cadets enlisted at Wallachia's Military School. In 1855, he traveled to Czernowitz, where he paid homage to Emperor Franz Joseph. At the time, the Beizadea approached France's Minister of Foreign Affairs, Édouard Drouyn de Lhuys, asking him to provide training for Wallachian militias in the event of war with the Ottomans; he also obtained the recall of a hostile consul, Eugène Poujade.

Știrbei family arms

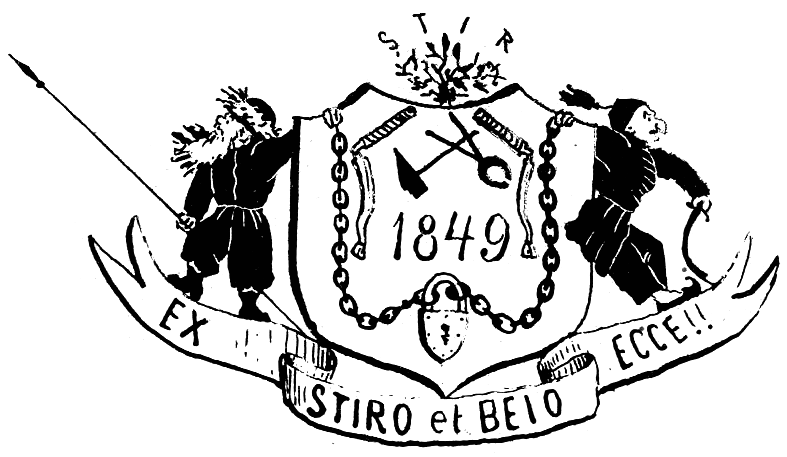
Parody Știrbei arms, mocking the family's conservatism, in Ghimpele (January 1867). Showing instruments of repression, with a Cossack and an Ottoman soldier for supporters. In crest, the redroot pigweed (știr) is a pun on the family name

Through his son, Prince Barbu also communicated his plans for establishing the "United Principalities" of Wallachia, Moldavia, and Southern Bessarabia, with perpetual neutrality and full independence, to guard the mouths of the Danube against Russian encroachment. These plans also provided for the election to the unified throne of a foreign prince, unconnected to the boyardom. Drouyn de Lhuys promised to uphold these principles at the subsequent Vienna Conference of 1855, but modified them crucially, endorsing instead Moldavia and Wallachia's annexation by Austria, in exchange for a Franco–Austrian alliance treaty; this project failed to materialize. Attending the Paris Peace Conference in 1856, the Beizadea resigned himself to the discovery that his father's mandate would not be renewed, and from that point on demanded that a foreign dynasty be placed on Wallachia's throne. The Știrbeis also began lobbying for the construction of a railway from Kronstadt to Oltenița. If built, it would have been Wallachia's first.

Expatriate Moldavian author V. A. Urechia claimed that, in order to secure the "moldy throne" of Wallachia, young Știrbei was actively courting Count von Buol's daughter, Josephine. Appointed Caimacam in July 1856, Alexandru II Ghica immediately ordered State Secretary Plagino and Spatharios Știrbei to be stripped of their offices, and announced a formal investigation of the deposed regime, which caused an uproar among the Știrbeists. In early 1857, the Beizadea had resumed his diplomatic tour—according to notes left by poet Grigore Alexandrescu, he openly associated with Grigore Pereț, who had tried to kill his uncle Bibescu, and asked the Ottomans to send in a military force in support of his agenda; these gaffes caused additional friction between the two conservative camps. Also according to Alexandrescu, Știrbei's father "is not detested, but not for lack of trying" (dacă nu este rău privit vina nu este a sa).

=== Conservative unionist ===
Unpopular with the boyars, and faced with their passive resistance, Ghica sought to reconcile with the moderate wing of the National Party, a loose group which advocated union. After this period of uncertainty, Barbu Știrbei won a seat as deputy to the ad-hoc Divan in the September 1857 race. Both father and son took a reserved stance on the unionist issue, favoring good relations with the Ottoman Empire, which did not approve of the National Party. Following Ghica's demotion and the reshuffle of 1858, the Știrbeis controlled Manu, one of the three new Caimacami. With the introduction of new rules limiting suffrage, George was still one of the "direct voters", registered as such at Balta, Romanați County. His yearly income was given as 1,000 thaler.

The Știrbeist project was damaged by the election of January 1859, in which both Bibescu brothers stood as candidates in Dolj County. The Beizadea also ran at Dolj's landowners college, in what was reported as a dirty race, complete with "machinations and base intrigues." As reported by Steoa Dunărei, he also took a seat in neighboring Romanați, though he eventually preferred to be listed as a Dolj deputy, along with Dimitrie Bibescu. On January 19–20, he signed up to a Committee of conservative deputies, which supported either his father or Bibescu for the Wallachian throne. Led by physician Apostol Arsache (the Assembly president), they promised to govern Wallachia in accordance with the "principles of moderation and social progress", and also to uphold property against any promises of expropriation.

A set of circumstances, utilized to its advantage by the National Party, resulted in the election to the throne of a Moldavian, Alexandru Ioan Cuza, as Domnitor of both countries—now officially the "United Principalities". His father's ambition of reaching the same result from a more conservative basis was frustrated on January 23, when his own candidacy for the throne was rejected by the deputies. In his later notes, Beizadea Știrbei confided that he had wanted the throne for himself, against both Cuza and his own father; still, he "enthusiastically voted for Cuza". Prince Barbu was ill at home, absenting from the reunion of deputies which unanimously confirmed Cuza; George brought him the proclamation, so that he could sign it.

After his own confirmation to the newly-formed Legislative Assembly, the Beizadea defined himself as the leader of a centrist faction. According to the left-wing's C. A. Rosetti, he only rejected the right because the latter did not endorse his candidacy for the throne; "once he grew aware, or was made aware, of the absurdity of his attempt, he moved to the right". The policies supported by Știrbei already blended with those of extreme conservatism: he and Florescu proposed an illiberal press law, drawing protests from their fellow deputy, the journalist Cezar Bolliac. A wider conflict soon erupted between the Cuzas and the Știrbeis. Already in July 1859, while seemingly vacationing at Mont-Dore-les-Bains, Beizadea Știrbei attacked Cuza in a protest paper addressed to the foreign powers, alleging that the new regime equated anarchy. The consolidated opposition, headed by Barbu Catargiu and Constantin N. Brăiloiu, wanted him to lead their Conservative Committee, but Știrbei dropped out and Plagino was considered instead. During that legislature, he and Catargiu, who served as the Minister of Finance, had extensive disagreements over budgetary matters and economic policies. However, according to a note in the Gazzetta Ufficiale, he was the "natural leader" of a "conservative party, comprising for the most supporters of the former princes Stirbey and Bibesco [sic]". Similarly, historian Nicolae Iorga describes the conservative faction as a "party of the pretenders", uniting George Barbu with Bibescu's heirs.

Eventually, Știrbei joined the Assembly in the 1860 election, taking the majority vote at Craiova. This race was also mired in controversy, after the authorities alleged that he had bribed the electorate. In March, he joined the committee which was to present Cuza with the Assembly's stances, but he resigned over disagreements with his colleagues. During the ramified scandal, his alleged direct threats against Cuza resulted in his arrest. He was charged with high treason and, reportedly, "Romanians [felt] passionate about the prisoner, asking that he stand trial." The breach of his parliamentary immunity degenerated into a national embarrassment, prompting the collective resignation of Ion Ghica's Wallachian cabinet. He retook his seat in the 1861 race. This came shortly after violent riots in Craiova, which, Știrbei argued, called for a parliamentary inquiry. Carried by an anti-Cuza majority opposed in particular to land reform, this legislature elected him Vice President, seconding Catargiu. According to various sources, he was also the President of that body.

=== "Monstrous coalition" ===
An Ottoman diplomat, Aristarchi Bey, recounted in June 1861 that "the prince Stirbey" and other "leading boyars" were fostering "agitation in favor of a foreign prince"; this move, he suspected, had Russian backing. In effect, the Știrbeis' protector, Kiselyov, who was by then the Russian Ambassador to France, pledged some support for bringing the Principalities under a foreign-born Domnitor; George saw Nicholas Maximilianovich de Beauharnais as the most worthy choice for the throne. Together, Știrbei, Alexandru Constantin Moruzi and Manolache Costache Epureanu pushed the Assembly into a deadlock, filibustering over Cuza's attempt to introduce a copyhold (embatic), set aside for landless peasants and supplied from the monastery land reserve.

During those moths, Știrbei drew close to the conservative club formed by Arsache, maintaining only loose contacts with the Catargiu faction—they differed on foreign policy issues, with Știrbei favoring an anti-Ottoman stance that Catargiu thought excessive. In July 1861, Știrbei and Catargiu, who was by then the Prime Minister of Romania, reviewed with alarm a meeting of the left-wing liberals on Filaret Hill, which had demanded increased political representation. That same month, the Beizadea's estate in Băilești witnessed resistance among the tenant farmers, who failed to show up for their corvée. In September, Știrbei's commitments were probed by a French envoy, the Viscount Saint-Vallier, who tried to persuade Știrbei and Plagino that they needed to back down Cuza's project for complete administrative unification. Both interlocutors assured him that they would not oppose this outcome, though Știrbei was still primarily hoping for the institution of a foreign dynasty. During the interview, the Beizadea expressed his worries that Cuza was an all-out radical who cultivated a friendship with the "socialist" Rosetti, noting that he and the entire landowning class were threatened with physical extermination.

Știrbei was described as a covert reactionary by Rosetti, but he protested against the label; a polemic ensued. According to historian Constantin C. Giurescu, a more significant phenomenon took place in the background, when "some of the reactionary 'right', namely Știrbei's followers, began a rapprochement with the 'left'" within the anti-Cuza conspiracy. By December 1861, the Beizadea was sponsoring Rosetti's daily newspaper Românul, which began advocating for Bibescu to replace Cuza. In June 1862, jointly with Rosetti and Ion Brătianu, Știrbei stepped down from the Assembly to protest Cuza's policies. Over the autumn months, he toured European capitals to obtain support for the conservative projects. In January of the following year, with conservatives recovering ground after Catargiu's assassination and other setbacks, he signed his name to a letter of protest against Cuza's authoritarianism. In April, he publicized his tax resistance and litigation with the authorities of Amzei suburb, Bucharest.

Știrbei was subsequently a noted player in the "monstrous coalition", grouping left-liberals and "White" conservatives against Cuza and his centrist government. In September 1863, he and D. Ghica were star defenders at Rosetti's own trial for sedition. Appearing alongside Brătianu and Anastasie Panu, Știrbei now spoke about press freedom as being vital for civic education. With Cuza taking more radical positions on land reform, Știrbei also revised his stance. Alongside a bipartisan committee (comprising Rosetti, Brătianu, Panu, Ion Ghica, Anton I. Arion, Grigore Arghiropol and Nicolae Golescu), he now supported the sale of state land to the landless.

Late in 1863, Știrbei and Grigore Sturdza welcomed Panu as he arrived in Bucharest to supervise the coalition. Cuza's own response to the resistance was a show of force in January 1864, when an Ilfov County's "peasant militia" was paraded through the city streets. The pro-Cuza gazette Aghiuță reported that both Știrbei and Sturdza were successfully intimidated. "Before they left for Paris," they reportedly sent Rosetti a letter demanding to know why he, as the radicals' leader, could not prevent the Bucharest masses from joining in the maneuvers. The Beizadea returned in April "with a political battle plan prepared by the former Princes—Gh[eorghe] Bibescu and Barbu Știrbei—and reviewed on a daily basis by C. A. Rosetti." Publicly, Știrbei Sr had joined a group of former dignitaries in offering some financial support to Cuza's promise of land reform, donating to a compensatory fund for the monastery estates. By April, the process was blocked: according to Aghiuță, the Assembly uncharacteristically decided that a vote on expropriation could not take place as long as a number of deputies, including both Panu and Beizadea Știrbei, were absent from the proceedings.

=== Under Carol ===
The Domnitor followed up with a self-coup in May 1864. In the aftermath, Cuza began sending out signals that he intended to establish a Romanian dynasty, allowing references to his illegitimate son, Alexandru "Sașa", as "heir to the throne". This helped to alienate moderates, pushing them closer to the anti-Cuza camp; in June 1865, Știrbei Jr, Bibescu, Brăiloiu, Brătianu, Ion Ghica, Panu and Rosetti, alongside Beizadea Dimitrie Ghica, produced a formal pledge that they would "support by any means the election of a foreign prince from a Western ruling house." During early 1865, Cuza's secretary, Arthur Baligot de Beyne, kept records of the Beizadea's meetings with other opposition heads. Știrbei continued to support union and worked toward national independence for the new state. Also in 1864, he issued a protest against British attempts to consolidate Ottoman suzerainty over the United Principalities. In his note to Drouyn de Lhuys, Știrbei spoke about the "compact and homogeneous race" of Romanians settled "from the Dniester down to the Theiss", united in the aspiration of becoming a single national polity.

Eventually, Cuza was toppled by the "monstrous coalition" in early 1866—a secretive palace coup in which Știrbei allegedly had a prominent role. Following the election of April 17–19, 1866, Știrbei was sent to the unified Assembly of Deputies, which was debating the new Constitution. He was one of two Craiova deputies, alongside Grigore Racoviță; reviewing this victory, Gazeta Transilvaniei newspaper acknowledged Știrbei as "more of a democrat than his father". He adopted a classical liberal stance, explaining that both his party and the liberals could agree on the restoration of "true freedom". However, he cautioned against full Westernization, noting that Romania's constitution "should suit the mores of the people for which it is conceived." Despite reintroducing pluralism, the regime change had left uncertain the continuation of Moldo–Wallachian federalism. In that context, Știrbei became one of the Romanian diplomats tasked with obtaining an international settlement recognizing continued union under a foreign Domnitor. However, as reported by his supervisor Ion Bălăceanu, Știrbei also tried to promote his own bid for the throne, which was received with ridicule. His father also entertained the notion that either George or one of his brothers would be selected.

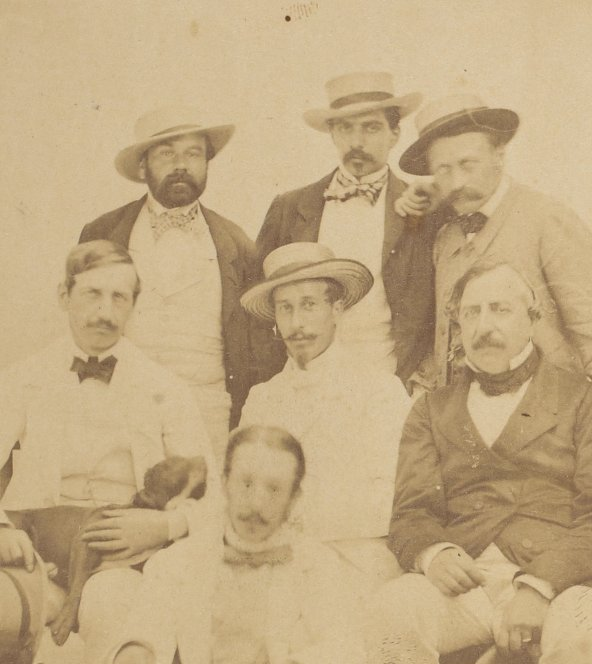
Știrbei (middle) with scions of French nobility, ca. 1860–1870

Eventually, Știrbei recognized the results of the April plebiscite and communicated to the Prussian prince Carol of Hohenzollern, that Romanians wanted him as their Domnitor. In September, his father, who was living his final years in Nice, made a show of his loyalty by visiting Carol in Bucharest, pledging his and his sons' "industrious and faithful" support. From July 15, Știrbei had joined Ghica's national cabinet as Minister of Foreign Affairs, endeavoring to ensure Ottoman recognition for a continued union under Carol. He and the Domnitor went to Istanbul for the firman, which was granted to them by Abdülaziz. Carol signaled his refusal of direct vassalage by making Știrbei read the document, which signaled to Abdülaziz that he considered himself an equal. Știrbei also took some of the first steps in bringing Romania closer to Austria-Hungary, which remained a staple of the conservative approach to foreign politics. He began talks with the Count von Beust regarding the exchange of consuls, extradition procedures, and connecting Romania's railway grid with the StEG.

The Beizadea joined the 60-man conservative caucus in the Assembly, and, after the election of November 1866, was recognized as a factional leader, alongside Dimitrie Ghica. The political realignment made him an adversary of the liberal camp. Its magazine, Ghimpele, claimed that Știrbei was a comical man, "stuffed on princely might and pride", whose activity as minister amounted to "continuously advising the empires" on how to handle Romania. Știrbei was reconfirmed as deputy for Dolj and Craiova in the December 1867 election, this time without controversy. The Domnitor, who found him to be a competent diplomat, also considered him for his Prime Minister. The latter proposal, endorsed by the French, was vetoed by Karl Anton of Hohenzollern, who feared that Știrbei had not renounced his bid for the throne. Reportedly, this greatly disappointed the candidate, contributing to his decision to quit politics and the country altogether—although, according to other accounts, he cited reasons of health. As noted in 1880 by a friend, the art historian Ernest Chesneau, Știrbei sensed a need for "independence".

Știrbei was residing in Nice by February 1868, when he attended a gala for the European Squadron, alongside Alfred Le Roux, Ludwig II of Bavaria, and the Duke of Parma. He still resented the liberals' approach to foreign policy, and, late in 1868, traveled to Pest, Hungary, where he was received by the Minister-President, Gyula Andrássy. Știrbei claimed that the liberals would allow Romania to be invaded by Russia, with Andrássy assuring him that Austria-Hungary would respond militarily, without herself annexing the former Principalities. During the final years of the French Empire, Știrbei served Napoleon III as a diplomat, and was made by him a Commander of the Legion of Honor. After his departure, the family's political role in the new Kingdom of Romania was fulfilled by his brother Alexandru, who served as chairman of the Conservative Party and had several ministerial positions.

=== Bécon withdrawal ===
From 1869, Beizadea George based himself in Paris, purchasing an apartment on Boulevard Haussmann, and, in 1871, also an Empire-style château in Bécon-les-Bruyères. The latter had been a temporary home by Adolphe Thiers, and then an Orsini residence; heavily damaged by the Paris Commune, it was restored and enlarged by its new owner. Settling in France for good, he forfeited his inheritance of the Știrbei Palace on Calea Victoriei, which went to his brothers, alongside the Buftea estates. Instead, he took his parents' residence in Nice and most of Barbu's French assets. The issue, contested between him and his siblings, was settled at the Court of Cassation in 1873. This landmark case imposed on him to share the villa with the other inheritors, with special criteria for calculating the inheritance tax. At the time, Știrbei was suing the administration of Paris for damages to his château, taking Jules Favre as his lawyer. In 1882, as Paris auctioned off the ruins of Tuileries Palace, also destroyed by the Commune, Știrbei purchased the fence, which became part of Bécon complex.

By 1878, Știrbei was a trustee of Le Temps, a life insurance provider founded by the Alfred Blanche of the Conseil d'État. His other sources of income included journalism, with opinion pieces that he signed with the pen name "James Caterly", and with articles in Journal des Débats. As such, he was immersing himself in French cultural life. According to Georges Duval, the "excellent prince" Știrbei "discreetly rescued the unfortunate, just as he was providing for the talented ones." During the cultural purge that followed the proclamation of a Third French Republic, Știrbei protected and sponsored sculptor Jean-Baptiste Carpeaux, the aging Bonapartist, purchasing his various works. In 1875, when the Prince took Carpeaux with him to Nice, painter Bruno Chérier noted a change for the better: "A fairy and her magic wand could not have pulled it off better in transforming our poor Carpeaux." The two, he recalled, lived in "princely luxury". Chesneau calls Știrbei a "grand lord by birth and character", who welcomed Carpeaux with "charming familiarity", while D. S. MacColl credits him with having "rescued [Carpeaux] from a Dantesque misery of disease and squalor."

In August 1875, when Carpeaux was made Grand Officer of the Legion of Honor, Știrbei was the first to bring him the news, at the church in Courbevoie. The artist died a few weeks later at Bécon, "consoled by the touching care of his princely host." Controversially, Știrbei had purchased Carpeaux's drawings (including his study after the cadaver of Victor Liet) and his seal of authenticity, which technically allowed him to pass plaster cast as the originals; for several years, he battled in court with the Carpeaux estate over ownership of these items, ultimately relinquishing the seal. Before donating the drawings, Știrbei released them as an album, published using photoengraving. Carpeaux's tomb was another issue of contention: the Prince had ordered the body to be buried in Courbevoie, giving it a lavish funeral. The widow, who was kept absent from the ceremony, sued and won, taking the remains to Valenciennes.

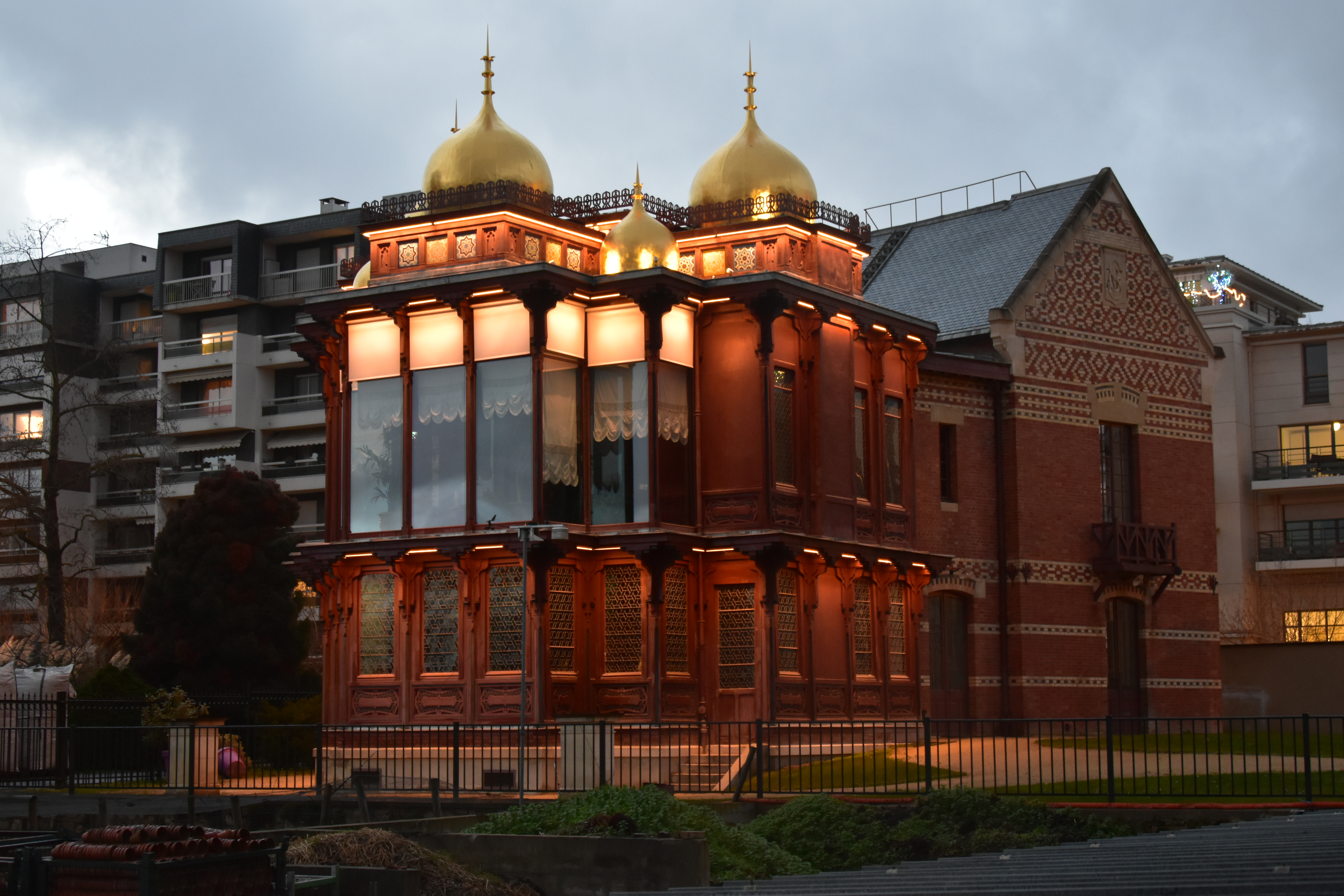
Caspar Purdon Clarke's Indian pavilion, set up by Știrbei in Bécon-les-Bruyères (Courbevoie)

Știrbei was also the patron of Rosa Bonheur and, from 1888, an organizer of the Auguste Feyen-Perrin collectors' committee. He built up the rest of his art collection with samples from other artists, notably Pierre Puvis de Chavannes, Giulio Bergonzoli, Emilio Zocchi, and Valérie Simonin. The latter, originally an actress, was married to the playwright Gustave-Eugène Fould (and was as such the daughter-in-law of Bonapartist Achille Fould). Știrbei had been a confidant of her husband, who gave his daughter Georges Achille a male name in honor of Știrbei. Following Gustave's death in 1884, Valérie remained the Prince's close friend, so much so that in 1888 Știrbei adopted both Georges Achille and her other daughter, Consuelo Fould.

In 1883, the Beizadea sold his Romanian estate at Cilieni to Petre Grădișteanu and Dimitrie Sturdza's insurance company, Naționala. From 1885, Știrbei applied for naturalization as a French citizen, which he obtained in 1888. In 1895, he married Simonin. He took personal care of his adoptive daughters' training in art, allowing them to study with Léon Comerre and Ferdinand Roybet. He also bought India and Sweden–Norway's pavilions from the 1878 World's Fair (respectively designed by Caspar Purdon Clarke and Henrik Thrap-Meyer), which became their respective studios.

=== Final decades ===
In March 1887, rumors spread that Știrbei intended to replace Alexander of Battenberg on the Bulgarian throne. According to the Moskovskiye Vedomosti, he was supported in this by Britain. Știrbei dismissed such stories, insisting that he had "no intention of reentering the political scene". During that period of his life, although isolated, Știrbei still entertained Romanian guests, including, in 1888, the journalist Alexandru Ciurcu. Following his brother Alexandru's illness and death in early 1895, George also continued to have links with his Romanian family. In 1901, he and his cousin Alexandru Bibescu helped organize the Paris wedding between Dimitrie Știrbei's daughter, Martha, and Hans von Blome. His manor in Băilești was targeted by peasant rebels in early 1907. From Paris, Știrbei sent telegrams asking that the 5th Chasseurs Battalion intervene in force; 42 peasants were killed during the resulting skirmish.

By then, George's large family included numerous figures of importance in politics and literature. Alexandru's children included Barbu Știrbey, the "White Prince", and his brother George, who expanded their father's estate. The "White Prince" in particular reclaimed the family's political role, briefly serving as Prime Minister in 1927. He was famous as the lover of Queen Marie of Romania, and alleged father of Princess Ileana. Barbu's sister Eliza was the wife of two other Prime Ministers, Alexandru Marghiloman and Ion I. C. Brătianu. Their sisters, who died young, married into the elite: one was the mother of George Cretzianu, and the other the wife of Radu R. Rosetti. The Prince also had pilot Marina Știrbei for a niece, and, on the Bibescu side, nephews George Valentin Bibescu, the aviation pioneer, and Antoine Bibesco, who also lived in France and was famous for his friendship with novelist Marcel Proust. A French grandniece, Anna de Noailles, was celebrated for her literary contributions, especially after 1902.

From 1891 to 1902, Știrbei edited a posthumous edition of Weiss' complete works at Calmann-Lévy, followed in 1910 by his monograph J.-J. Weiss, conférencier, chroniqueur de théâtre, journaliste. His own one-act comedy, La légende de Saint Déodat, came out at Firmin Didot in 1905, with illustrations by Maurice Leloir. In 1906, Prince George welcomed to Paris the Romanian student Eugen Lovinescu, directing his own research on J.-J. Weiss. The work carried a dedication to Știrbei, in imperfect French; when this was pointed out to Lovinescu by his doctoral supervisors, he confessed that the Beizadea himself had submitted that portion of the text. As "James Caterly", Știrbei published the monograph Les Roumains (1908), which Lovinescu would translate and publish in Romania in 1909 or 1910. Știrbei's new protege was reserved in his overall opinion of the prince, writing that his Paris home resembled an old "boyar mansion", replete with objets d'art from the Orient. These, Lovinescu believed, were there to show that Știrbei missed his Wallachia. According to Știrbei's own words, he lived "surrounded by memories, by his books, in quiet isolation". From the 1880s onward, he had slowly divided his art objects between the Louvre, the École des Beaux-Arts, and the Angers and Valenciennes Museums; others remained preserved at their original location in Bécon.

In 1908, Iorga published in Romania a study on Barbu Știrbei's life and opinions. This included a letter by George Barbu, whom Iorga had thought to be dead, in which he mocked another one of Wallachia's princely families. As recounted by Iorga in 1934, the document enraged one of its descendants, a "very well known Bucharest man", who provoked Știrbei to a duel. The historian himself was asked by the White Prince to step in, helping the two enemies reconcile; he also wrote a letter of apology to George Știrbei, who never answered. Știrbei made the news again in August 1910, when one of his most trusted servants stole his wife's jewelry, worth 18,000 French francs, from her apartment on Boulevard de Courcelles. In 1913, he provided material support for August Pessiacov to publish his contributions to the local history of Craiova.

In 1916, at the height of World War I, Știrbei printed his complete works, including memoirs, as Feuilles d'automne et feuilles d'hiver. The book, praised by Iorga for its "wonderful patriotic sentiment", also had a Romanian edition which "no one even noticed." The same year, Les Roumains was republished under his real name, as part of a larger effort to circulate Romanian nationalist and related works in the Allied countries. The Beizadea was a widower from July 1919, when the aged Princess Valérie died at Pontaillac. Știrbei himself died a nonagenarian on the morning of August 15, 1925. His funeral service was held with military honors at the Catholic church of Saint-Charles-de-Monceau, and his burial took place at Père Lachaise Cemetery. In 1926–1928, his daughters were taken to court by the elderly Austrian tenor Georg Schütte Harmsen, who claimed to have been Știrbei's son by a chambermaid. Schütte, who showed records of his Orthodox baptism, received a positive verdict in primary court, but died "of joy" upon receiving the news. The Carpeaux controversy was prolonged into the 1930s and beyond by the sculptor's daughter Louise Clémentel, who repeated allegations made about Știrbei in her La verité sur l'oeuvre et la vie de Jean-Baptiste Carpeaux.

In 1928, the Știrbei estate was reportedly worth more than 100 million shilling. From this total, Consuelo assigned a special fund to the Institut de France, which grants an annual Știrbei award. She and Georges Achille inherited most of the assets, including the pavilions. The sisters had conflicting visions: Consuelo, who died in 1927, bequeathed her pavilion to host a memorial museum for Roybet; twenty years later, the municipality of Courbevoie confiscated the land for its own city museum. The core buildings of the château were razed in conjunction with the extension of La Défense, although in the end nothing was built to replace them. The former Swedish pavilion is home to a Roybet museum, which also has art by the Fould–Știrbei sisters. In 2013, the Indian pavilion was restored and, since 2015, has been a studio for sculptors-in-residence. Meanwhile, Știrbei's manor in Băilești was nationalized by the Romanian communist regime, and came to house the local town hall.
