= Juana Romani =

Italian painter

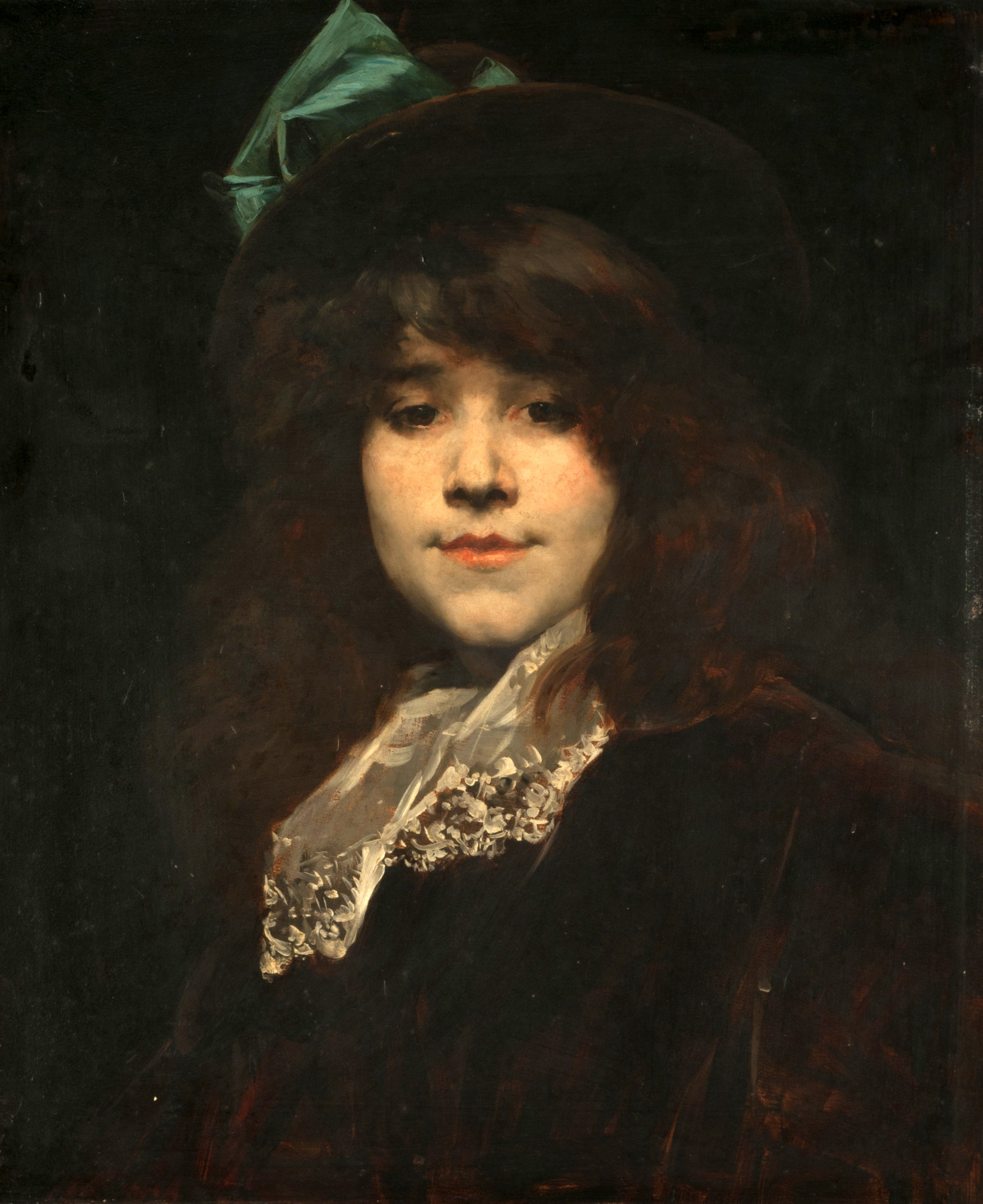
- Portrait of Juana Romani by Ferdinand Roybet (c.1890)
- Born: 30 April 1867; Velletri, Italy
- Died: 1923/24; Paris, France
- Known for: Painting
- Movement: Realism

Juana Romani (born Carolina Giovanna Carlesimo; 30 April 1867 – 13 June 1923) was an Italian-born French portrait painter and artists' model.

== Biography ==
She was born in Velletri (Latium, Italie) on 30 April 1867. At the age of ten, she moved to Paris with her mother and stepfather, Temistocle Romani, an engineer who was seeking employment there. They settled in the Latin Quarter, and she was put to work as a model at several art schools. It was not long, however, before Filippo Colarossi, founder of the Académie Colarossi, took a special interest in her, inviting her to work and study at his school.

In 1882, she posed for "Diana the Huntress", a well-known sculpture by Alexandre Falguière. She also posed for Carolus-Duran, Victor Prouvé, and Ferdinand Roybet, who gave her lessons, and Jean-Jacques Henner, with whom she had a brief affair. At the age of nineteen, "Il Romani", as she was called, decided to pursue her own career in art. That same year, she changed her first name to "Juana", the Spanish equivalent of her middle name, "Giovanna".

She began to exhibit her works in 1888 at the Salon of the Société des Artistes Français and exhibited with them regularly until 1904. She was especially valued as a painter of female portraits, including many women from notable families, often depicting them as mythological or symbolic figures. One of her portraits was awarded a silver medal at the Exposition Universelle (1889). In 1901, she donated 5,000 lire to the art school in her home town. Four years later, it was officially renamed the "Scuola d'Arte Juana Romani".

Her work was also well received by the critics. In 1896, Louis Gonse of Le Monde moderne declared that she was more skilful than her mentor, Roybet. She usually painted directly on the canvas, without preliminary sketching, and sold many works before they were finished.

In her later years, she became mentally unsound and was confined to a psychiatric hospital in Paris. She died there, forgotten, around 1924. Her remaining works were auctioned off at the Hôtel Drouot. Many of her paintings may be seen at the Musée d'Orsay.

== Modelling career ==
From 1882, she took her first steps in the artistic society as a model, first with the sculptor Alexandre Falguière and then with various famous painters such as Jean-Jacques Henner, Victor Prouvé, Raphaël Collin, Carolus-Duran, and Ferdinand Roybet, who admired her youthful yet well-shaped body, her mischievous face with a dimple on her chin, and her hair with reddish highlights. She posed for the sculpture Diana the Huntress, presented by Alexandre Falguière at the Salon of 1884. A version of this sculpture, carved in marble, is in the Musée des Augustins de Toulouse.

== As a painter ==
In 1887, Juana stopped posing and decided to focus exclusively on her artwork. Initially, she painted under her name, Carolina Carlesimo di Casalvieri, but occasionally signed her works as Veliterna Romains Juana. In 1888, she definitively adopted the pseudonym Juana Romani. In 1888, at the age of twenty-one, Romani participated in her first Salon, showing the public a watercolour painting titled La Gitane. Carolus-Duran, who oversaw the studio she attended, explicitly supported her by asking his colleague Jean-Jacques Henner to influence the jury members in her favour. (Note: Carolus-Duran's letter for Henner, Paris, 25 March 1888, archives musée Henner: « Mon cher ami, Je te remercie de ce que tu veux bien faire pour mes recommandés et puisque tu as la gentillesse de te charger d’appuyer nos amies, voici encore le nom que je te recommande chaudement et spécialement: Juana Carlesimo (notre Juana Romani). Je te serais reconnaissant de faire tout ton possible pour la faire accepter et avec un bon numéro si c’est possible. Recommande-la à Lefebvre et tous les membres que tu pourras car je ne peux assister aux premières séances de sélection. En cas d’échec, Tâche, je te prie, à la révision de faire reprendre son portrait Gitane – n°2177 – Je compte sur toi et te serre affectueusement la main. Carolus-Duran ») She regularly exhibited at the Société des artistes français from 1888 to 1904. According to the Catalogue Illustré du Salon des Artistes Français, the paintings exhibited by Juana include:

- 1888, Gitane
- 1889, Le Matin and Femme surprise.
- 1890, Hérodiade and Jeunesse.
- 1891, Judith and Magdeleine. (Note: Édouard Trogan (16 May 1891). "Au Salon". La Semaine des familles (in French): 105.. Il n'y a pas beaucoup de Madeleines cette année: mais deux du moins sont traitées magistralement: celle de Mlle Juana Romani et celle de son maître Henner, qu'il a baptisée Pleureuse, ce qui d'ailleurs est bien plus simple. Chez le maître et chez l'élève, c'est le même procédé; des chairs blanches, avec aux ombres, des tons de bronze florentin, des draperies sombres et vagues et des cheveux rouges. Ce sont de beaux morceaux de virtuosité, et c'est tout.)
- 1892, Bianca Capello et Manuela. Ferdinand Roybet expose son portrait Juana Romani. (Note: Édouard Trogan (21 May 1892). "Les Salons ds Champs d'Élysées". La Semaine des familles (in French): 119.. - Tout près, nous trouvons, de lui (Roybet) le portrait de Mlle. Juana Romani. Grands yeux, grande cape, grand chapeau, grande artiste: elle est devant nous, avec l'énigmatique sourire de son regard et de ses lèvres, sans « accessoires » et attirant seulement par l'inexprimable pensée qui se cache en elle. C'est une heureuse chance pour un artiste d'être compris par un artiste, et M. Roybet a bien vu que le talent de Mlle. Romani interdisait de faire d'elle un portrait tapageur et prétentieux. Elle expose, cette année, deux tableaux de femmes en dalmatiques très échancrées: Manuela et Bianca Capello, que je préfère.) (Note: George Lafenestre (May 1892). "Les Salons de 1892". Revue des Deux Mondes (in French): 633.. - Il y a là, en somme, beaucoup d’efforts, beaucoup de recherches, beaucoup de réussites, et nous ne saurions signaler tous les portraits dignes d’attention. Comme morceaux de virtuosité, pour la belle manœuvre de brosse, dans le goût des vieux maîtres des Pays-Bas, le Portrait de M. Louis Préfet et celui de Mlle Juana Romani signalent avec éclat la rentrée au Salon de M. Roybet, et la Bianca Capello et la Manuela de Mlle Juana Romani, deux études très savoureuses, montrent à leur tour l’élève rivale de son maître.)
- 1893, La fille de Théodora and Giovanelle. (Note: Édouard Trogan (27 May 1893). "Les Salons de 1893". La Semaine des familles (in French): 130. - Mlle. Juana Romani expose cette fois La fille de Théodora, une jeune fille aux yeux durs, à la bouche pincée, farouche, pleine de désirs et de fantaisies et dans une tout autre gamme, Giovanelle, une tête rieuse avec une très légère teinte de mélancolie, plus enlevée de touche que ses œuvres ordinaires, mais non pas moins aimable.)
- 1894, Pensierosa and Infante (Note: Édouard Trogan (9 June 1894). "Les Salons de 1894". La Semaine des familles (in French): 154.. - Hâtons-nous maintenant vers les envois de Mlle. Juana Romani, dont nous suivons avec le plus grand intérêt les progrès annuels. Elle s'est aujourd'hui surpassée. Elle n'a jamais rien fait de mieux que sa Pensierosa, qui est tout simplement exquise, drapée dans son grand manteau à revers rouges, les yeux braisillants comme des escarboucles sous le casque de cheveux noirs. Supposez la franche allure et la rondeur de dessin de M. Roybet, assouplies par la morbidesse habituelle de M. Henner et vous avez la formule primordiale du talent de Mlle Romani. Il n'y a rien d'étonnant, du reste, puisqu'elle est élève de l'un et de l'autre. mais ce que lui appartient en propre, c'est l'art de réunir des qualités si disparates. Elle a sa marque au Salon et n'est-ce rien que de faire dire au public devant une bonne toile:: « C'est un Romani ? ». On le dit, et en applaudissant, devant sa Pensierosa et devant son Infante, où, comme titre et même comme dispositions d'ensemble, elle n'a pas craint de se mesurer avec Vélasquez.)
- 1895, Primavera and Portrait de Mlle. M.G.. (Note: Édouard Trogan (8 June 1895). "Les Salons de 1895". La Semaine des familles (in French): 154. - Mlle. Juana Romani nous offre un Primavera toute exhilarante dans les vagues de ses cheveux fauves, et surtout un portrait de Mlle M.G., qui est une perle. Sous la gaze légèrement teintée de vert transparaît la carnation des bras et de la gorge. Les yeux, le sourire, les cheveux, tout est d'un admirable rendu. J'entends dire: c'est du truc ! Eh ! mes bons messieurs, truquez donc, je n'y vois pas d’inconvénient, pourvu que vos toiles soient aussi séduisantes. Le public ne peut juger que sur le résultat définitif. La préparation du chef-d’œuvre lui importe peu. L'essentiel, c'est d'avoir le chef-d’œuvre !)
- 1896 Fior d'Alpe and Desdemona
- 1897 Dona Mona and Faustolla da Pistoici
- 1898, Salomé. (Note: "Le Salon des Amis des Arts". Revue Philomathiue de Bordeaux et du Sud-ouest (in French): 108. 1899.. - En 1899, Juana expose son Salomé au Salon des Amis des Arts de Bordeaux. La commentaire: Mlle Juana Romani, élève de Henner et de Roybet, a pris à l'un son divin coloris, à l'autre sa verve et son large dessin. Salomé est une des œuvres les plus vibrantes de l'exposition) et Angelica
- 1899, Mina da Fiesole. (Note: Papillon (January 1901). "Salons parisiens". Le Feu Follet (in French) (1): 348–362.. - Juana Romani nous change ! C’est le triomphe de la couleur dans les chairs et les étoffes, débauche admirable de tons miroitants et nacrés. Belle à rendre fou, sa Mina da Fiesole.)
- 1900, Portrait de Mlle H.D.
- 1901, Portrait de Roger and Infante
- 1902, Portrait de Mme la Princesse Joachim Murat (Note: F. George-Morot (30 April 1902). "Tableaux de femmes-peintres". La Presse.. - Mlle Romani est plus connue que Mlle Dufau et que Mlle Delasalle. Elle est beaucoup moins personnelle; l'influence de ses maîtres Roybet et Henner est très visible, trop visible, dans tout ce qu'elle peint. Cependant son Portrait de la princesse Joachim Murat nous repose un peu des infantes aux chevelures éparses.) et Tizianella
- 1903, Portrait de Mlle Emmanuelle de Luynes and Portrait de Mme la duchesse de Palmella. (Note: F. George-Morot (30 April 1903). "Le Salon des artistes français". La Presse.. - Mlle Romani abandonne ses infantes séduisantes pour se consacrer aux portraits, elle y réussit admirablement; ceux de la Duchesse de Palmella et de Mlle Emmanuelle de Luynes plairont beaucoup.)
- 1904, Portrait de Roger Legge and Desdemona

Her painting, heir to a pictorial tradition linked to antiquity and marked by the influence of her masters (from Henner to Roybet), stages strong and sensual female figures drawn from biblical history, theatre, opera, history and art history. Romani painted Biblical heroines in her signature romantic style. With their long billowing hair, enigmatic poses, Romani's figures exude a mysticism and power that feels both in line with the height of 1900s Paris and fashion today.

== Selected paintings by Romani ==
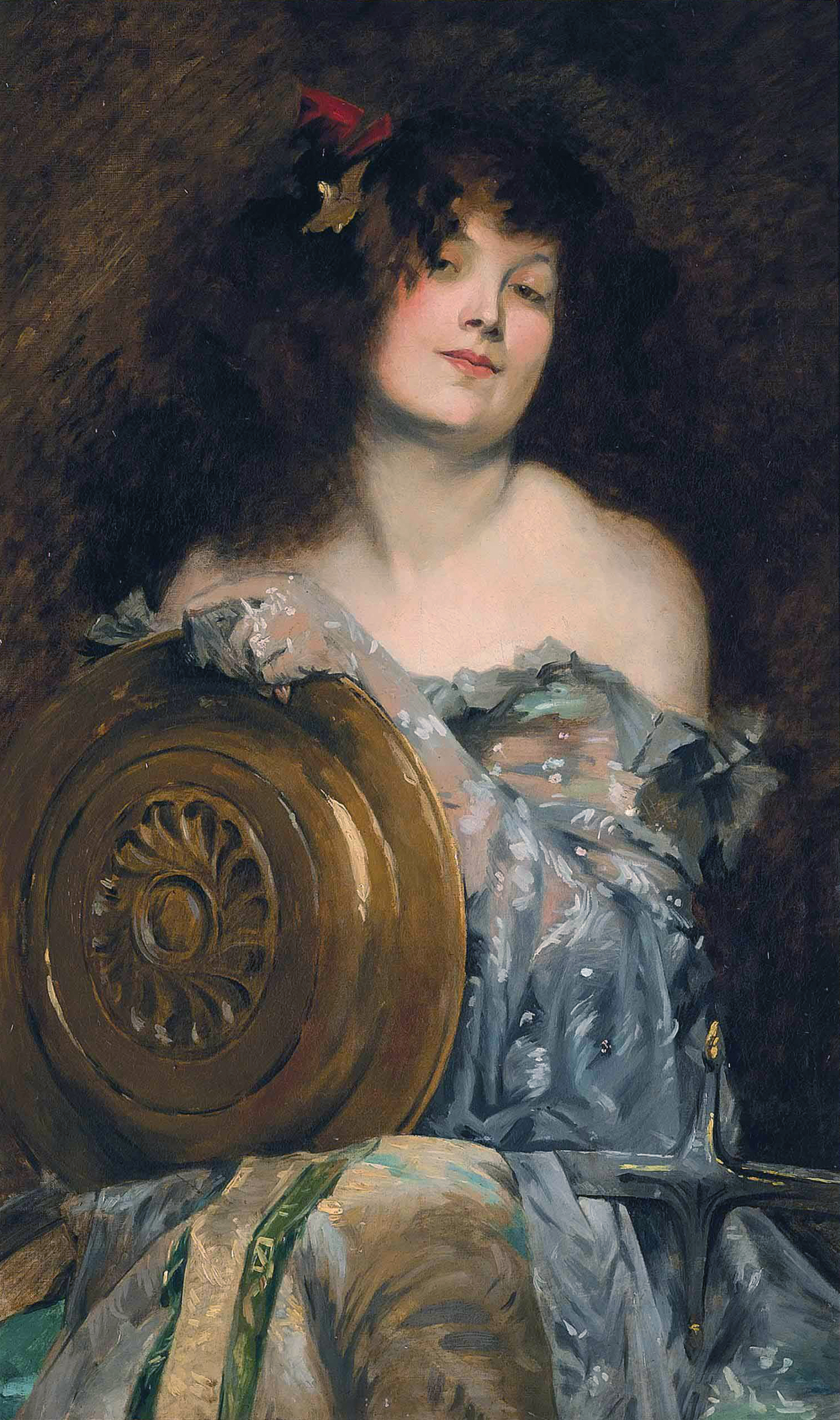
Salomé

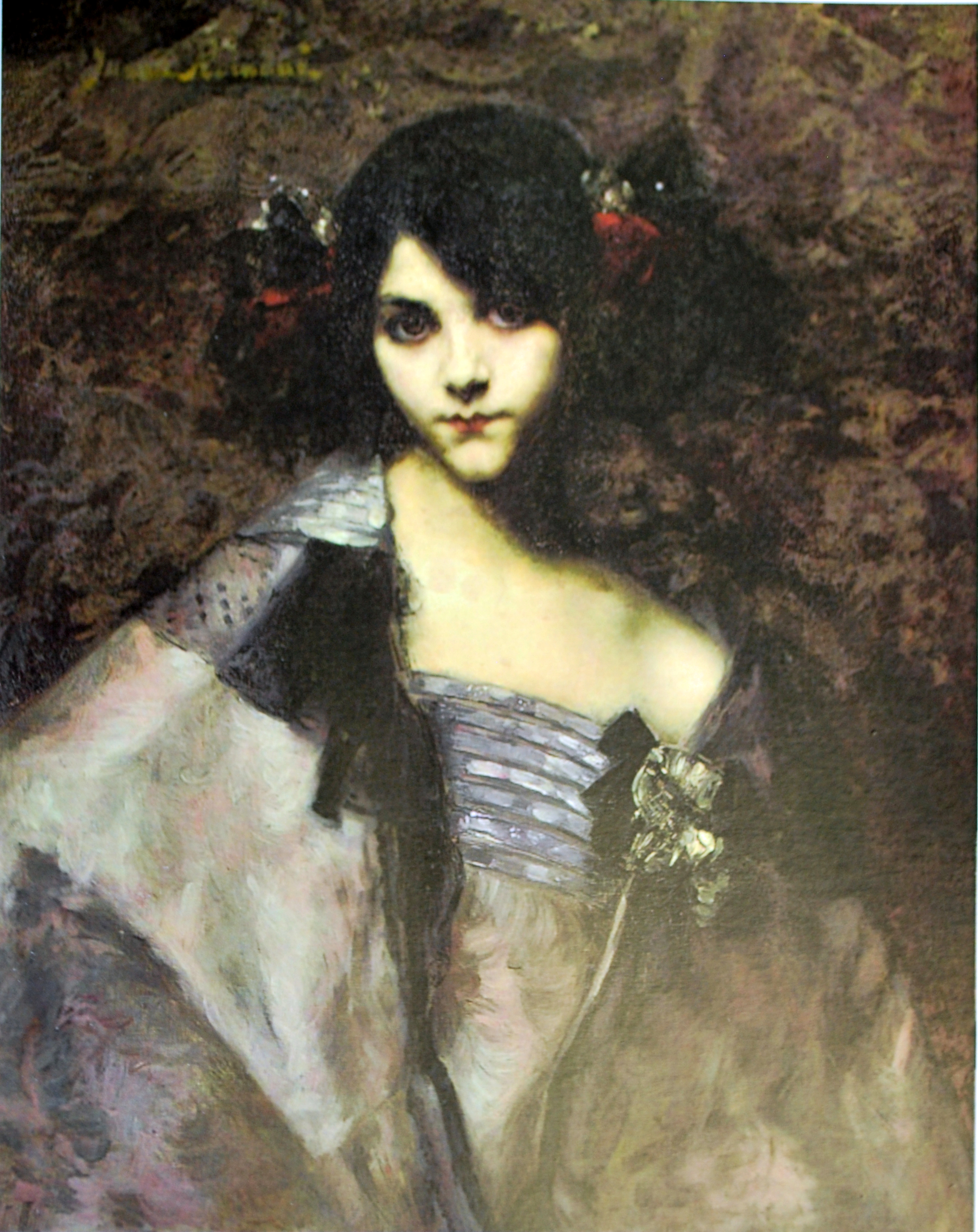
Bella Donna

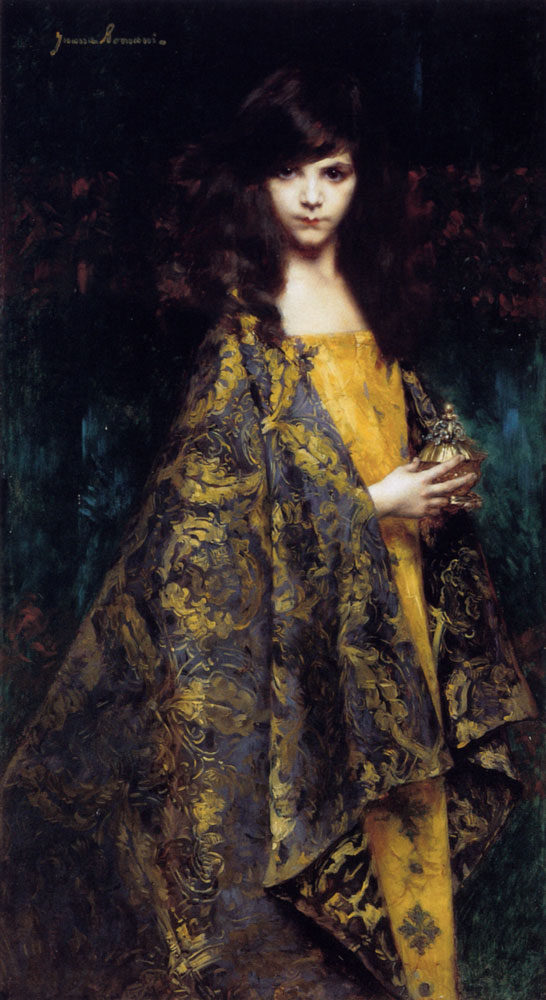
Angelica

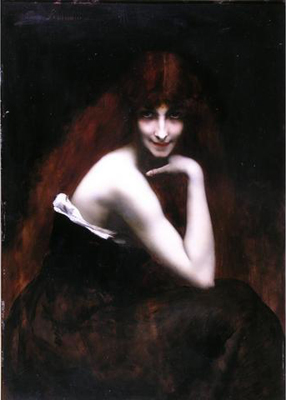
La Rossa

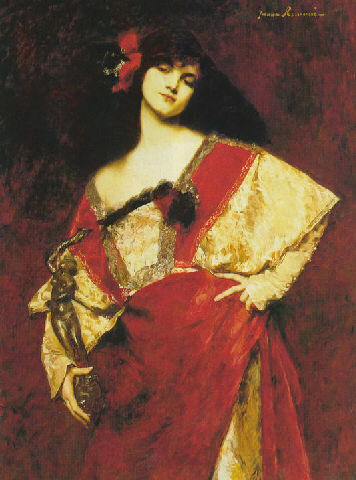
Tizianella

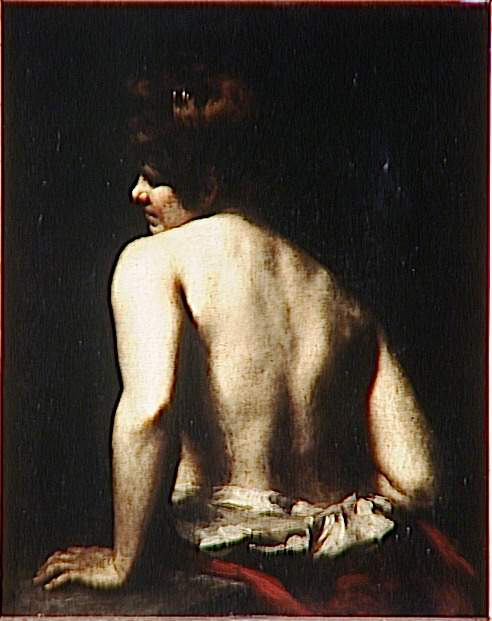
La Modella

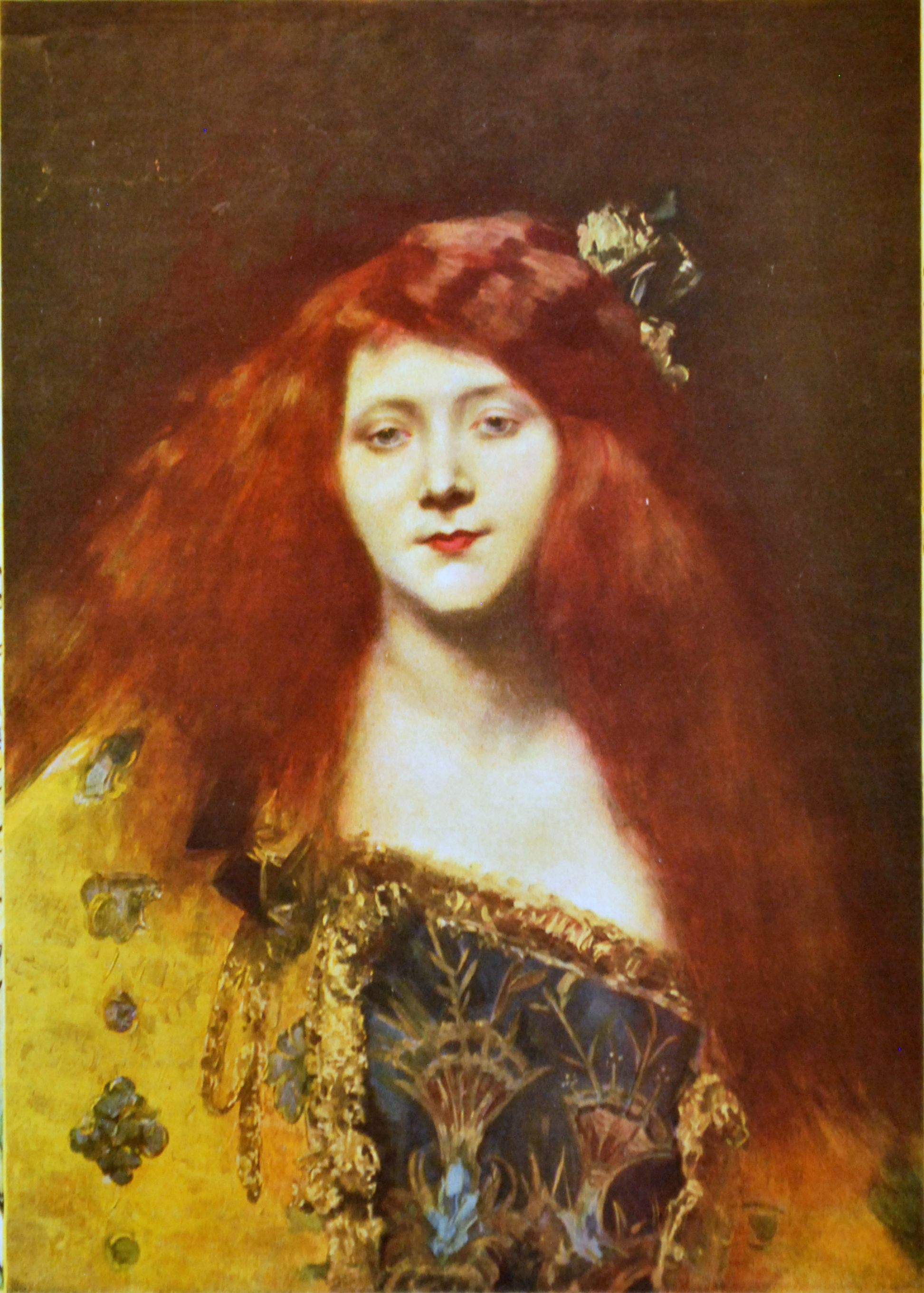
Leonora d'Este
