= Gheorghe Balș =

Romanian engineer, architect and art historian

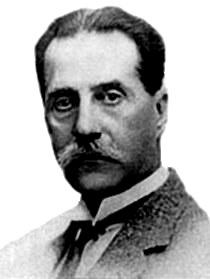
Gheorghe Balș

Gheorghe Balș (April 24, 1868 – September 22, 1934) was a Romanian engineer, architect and art historian.

Born in Adjud, Vrancea County, his parents Alecu Balș (1838-1894) and Roxanda Sturdza (d. 1878) were descended from prominent Moldavian boyar families. He studied in Lausanne, where he completed high school, and at the Zürich Polytechnic, where he earned an engineer's diploma. In 1891, after returning home, he was hired at the bridge inspection service of Căile Ferate Române state railway carrier. He worked with Anghel Saligny and possibly Louis Blanc on the King Carol I Bridge in Cernavodă and on the lighthouse in Tuzla. He worked on the Port of Constanța together with George Duca.

From 1908 to 1911, he worked in the technical service of the Interior Ministry's public health division. He collaborated closely with his brother-in-law Ioan Cantacuzino in the fight against tuberculosis, and was president of the Romanian Red Cross. Together with Nicolae Ghica-Budești, he built the Cantacuzino Institute in Bucharest in 1921. He was involved with the committee for historic monuments, joining in 1913 and later becoming vice president. In 1923, Balș was elected a titular member of the Romanian Academy. He died in Bucharest in 1934.

Together with Ghica-Budești and Nicolae Iorga, he sought to identify the influences that shaped Romanian architecture both in Moldavia and in Wallachia. His research took him to Bulgaria, Serbia, Greece, Turkey and the Russian Empire. Balș pointed to Armenian and Georgian as well as Serbian contributions, and his work on 15th and 16th-century Moldavian architecture was favorably received. He sat on numerous company boards, including those of a mine and of a credit bank for encouraging industrial firms. The Balș family had extensive rural properties in Moldavia, but his parents gradually had to sell their lands in order to pay off debts and losses by their administrators. In 1880, his father sold the imposing residence in Iași that today houses the Music Conservatory.

In 1897, Balș married Maria Știrbey, the daughter of prince Alexandru B. Știrbei and the sister of Barbu Știrbey. The marriage contract specifies that the bride received a trousseau of 25,000 lei, and that she wished to invest 200,000 lei of her parents' inheritance for building and furnishing a house. The couple had four children: Zoe (1897-1991), Alexandru (1898-1950s), Ion (1901-1980) and Matei (1905–1976). A high school in Adjud was named after Balș in 2006.
