= Valérie Simonin =

French actress and author

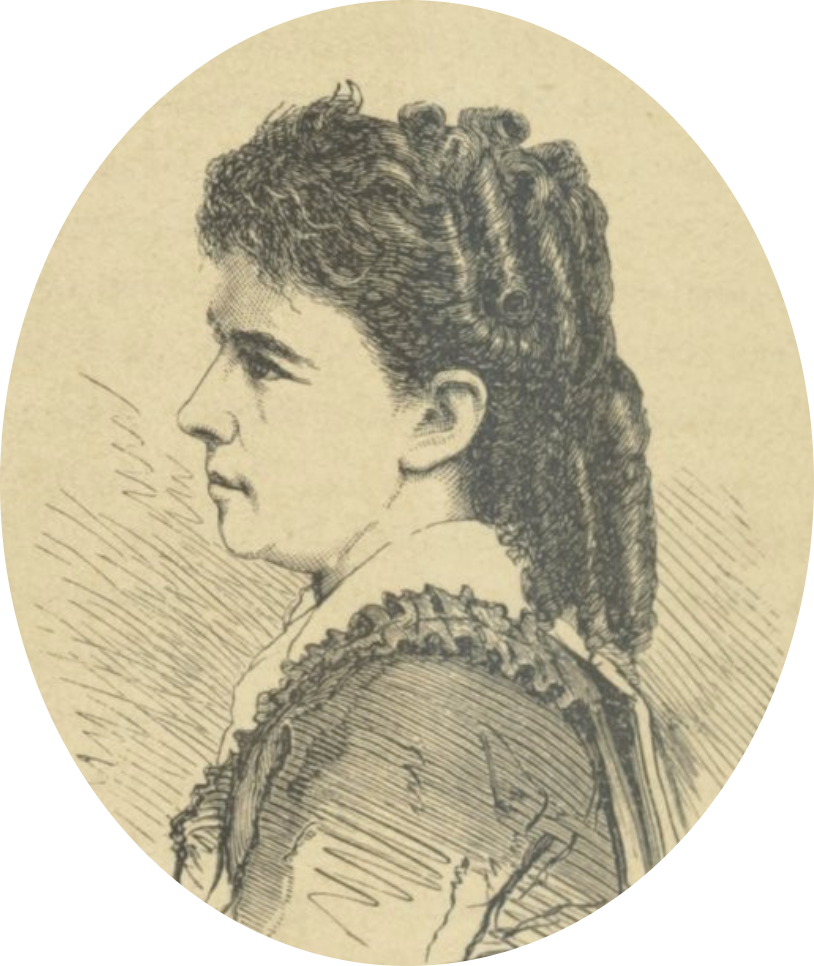
- Born: Wilhelmine-Joséphine Simonin; 19 December 1831; Paris, France
- Died: 25 June 1919 (aged 87); Pontaillac, France
- Other names: Gustave Haller
- Occupation(s): actress, writer
- Spouses: Gustave Eugene Fould, George Barbu Știrbei
- Children: Consuelo Fould, Georges Achille-Fould

Wilhelmine-Joséphine Simonin, known as Valérie Simonin, Lady Gustave Fould and Gustave Haller (19 December 1831, Paris – 25 June 1919, Pontaillac) was a French actress and author.

== Life ==
Wilhelmine-Joséphine Simonin was born on 19 December 1831 in Paris. In 1850, she entered the Paris Conservatory, and in 1852, she won the first prize for the comedy and immediately debuted at the Odeon theater.

From 1853 to 1859, Simonin was a board member of the French Comedy (Comédie française). In 1859, she quit theater and went to London to live with her mother and restore old books as she learned from her father. Simonin married Gustave Eugene Fould with whom she had two daughters, Consuello and Achille-Valéri.

Returning to France in 1864, she devoted herself to literature after the pseudonym Gustave Haller. Among her works should be mentioned such novels as L’enfer des Femmes, Le diagnostic, Le professeur d’amour and English novel Sternina. Having widowed in 1884, Simonin married for the second time to George Știrbei.

Valérie Simonin died on 25 June 1919 in Portaillac.

== Selected works ==
- Le salon, dix ans de peinture (1902)
- Le Sphinx aux perles, par G. Haller (1884)
- Le Duel de Pierrot, pièce en 5 actes (1881)
- Le Clou au couvent, aimez-vous. 2e éd. (1879)
- Nos grands peintres, par Gustave Haller. Catalogue de leurs oeuvres et opinions de la presse (1879)
- Le Clou au couvent (1879)
- Vertu, par Gustave Haller (1877)
- Aimez-vous (1877)
- Le Bleuet, par Gustave Haller. Préface de George Sand (1875)
- Le Médecin des dames, par Gustave Haller. [Paris, Cluny, 16 janvier 1870.] (1870)
