= Georges Achille-Fould =

French painter (1868–1951)

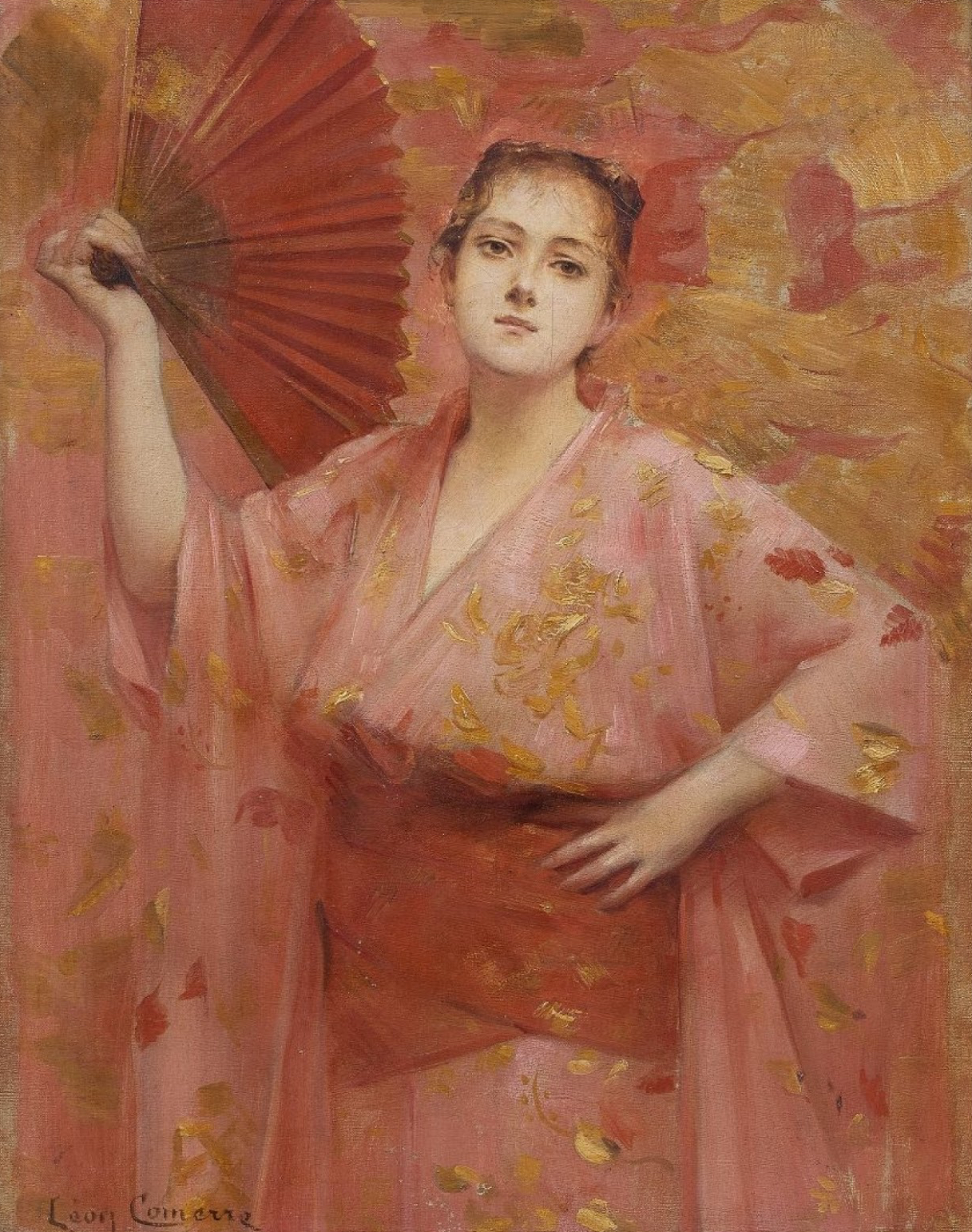
- portrait by Léon Comerre
- Born: 24 August 1868; Asnières-sur-Seine, France
- Died: 24 August 1951 (aged 83); Brussels, Belgium

Georges Achille-Fould or George-Achille Fould-Stirbey (French: [ʒɔʁʒ aʃil fuld]; 24 August 1868 – 24 August 1951) was a French painter.

Achille-Fould was born in Asnières-sur-Seine as the daughter of the actress Josephine Wilhelmine Valérie Simonin, better known under her pseudonym Gustave Haller, and politician Gustave-Eugène Fould (son of Achille Fould and member of the Fould family bankers). She was adopted along with her sister, the painter Consuelo Fould, by the Prince Stirbey. She and her sister were mentored by Rosa Bonheur, and she painted Bonheur's portrait in 1893. Her painting Courtship was included in the 1905 book Women Painters of the World. Her work was also part of the painting event in the art competition at the 1924 Summer Olympics.

Achille-Fould died in Brussels.

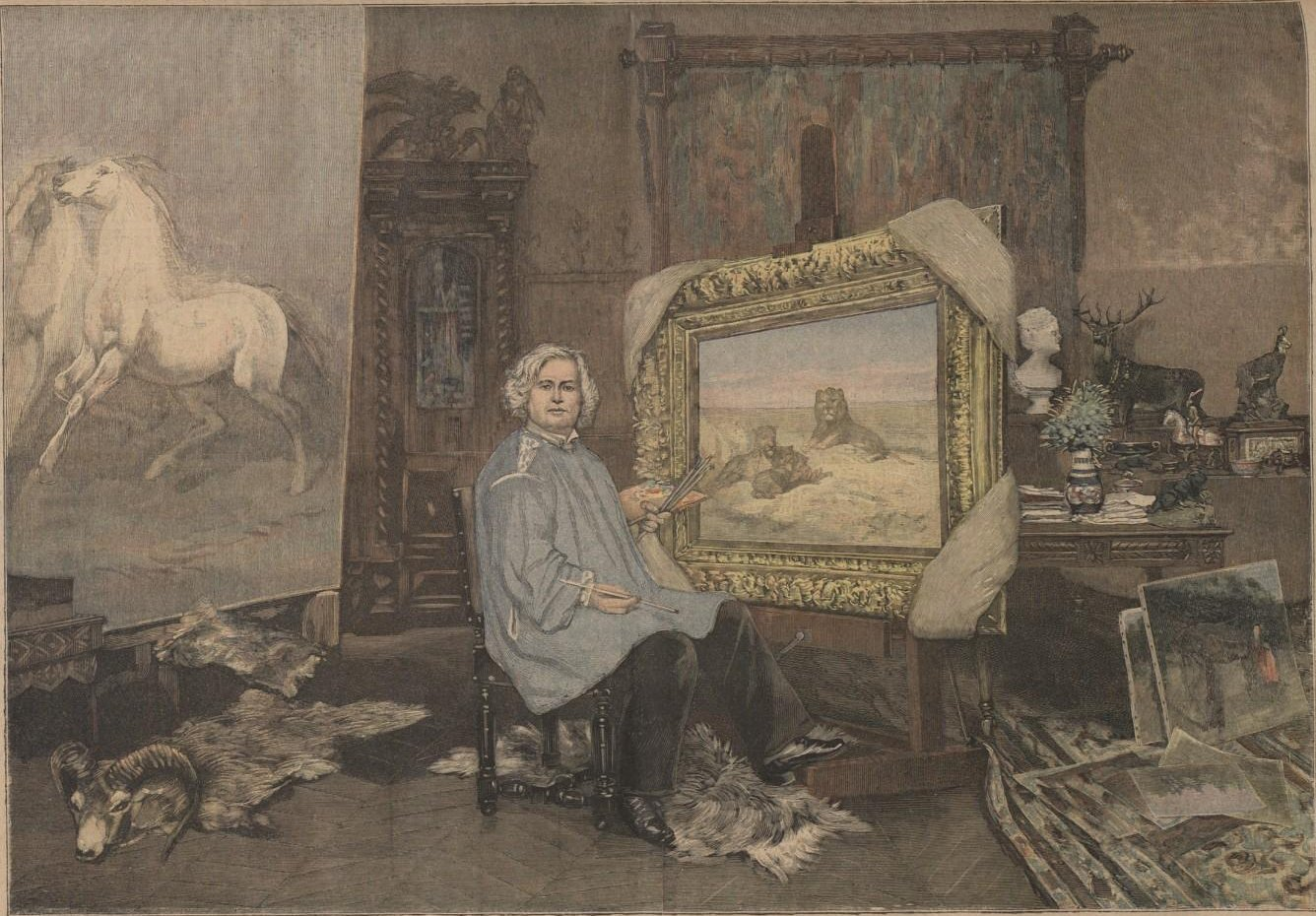
Rosa Bonheur in her atelier, 1893

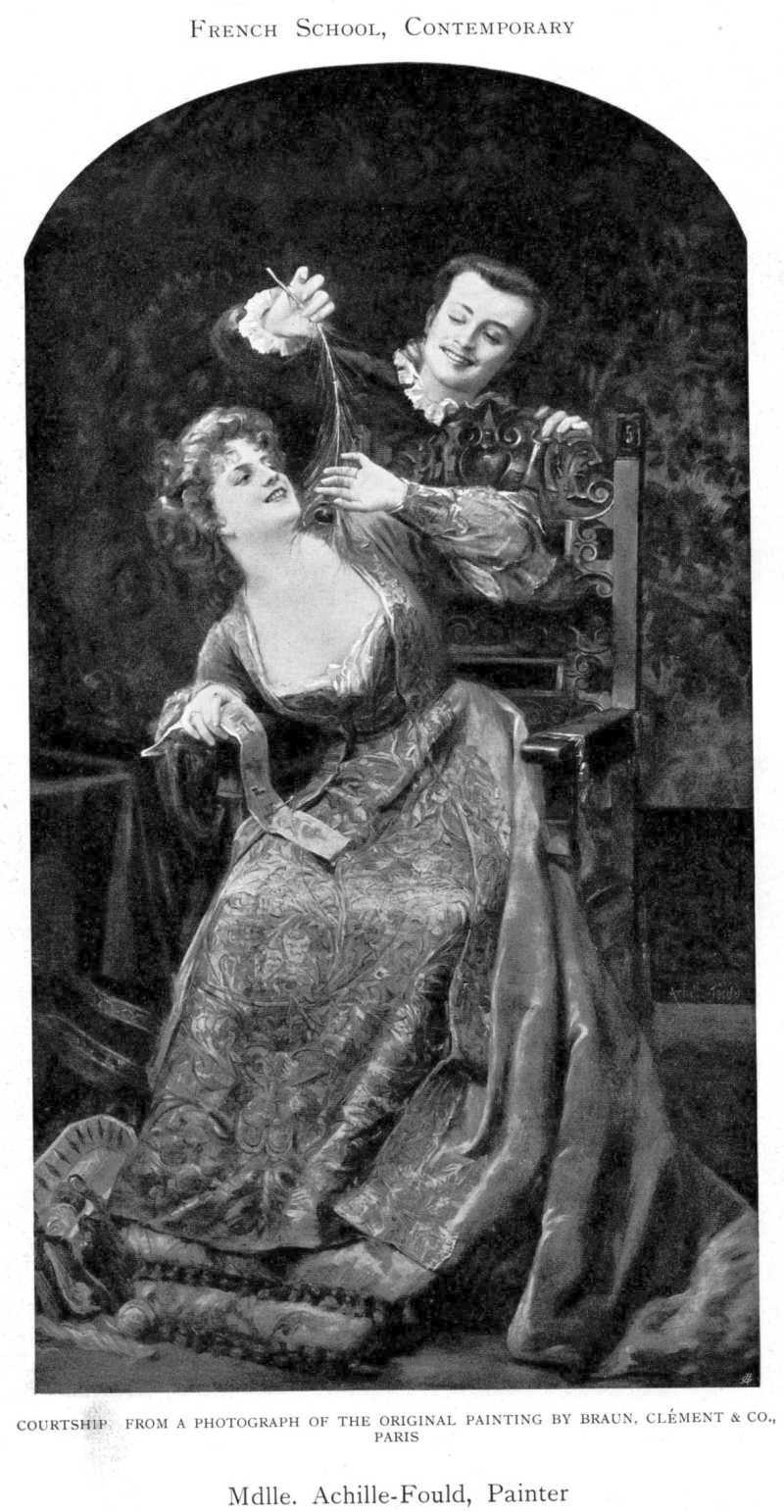
Courtship (photograph of painting, 1905)

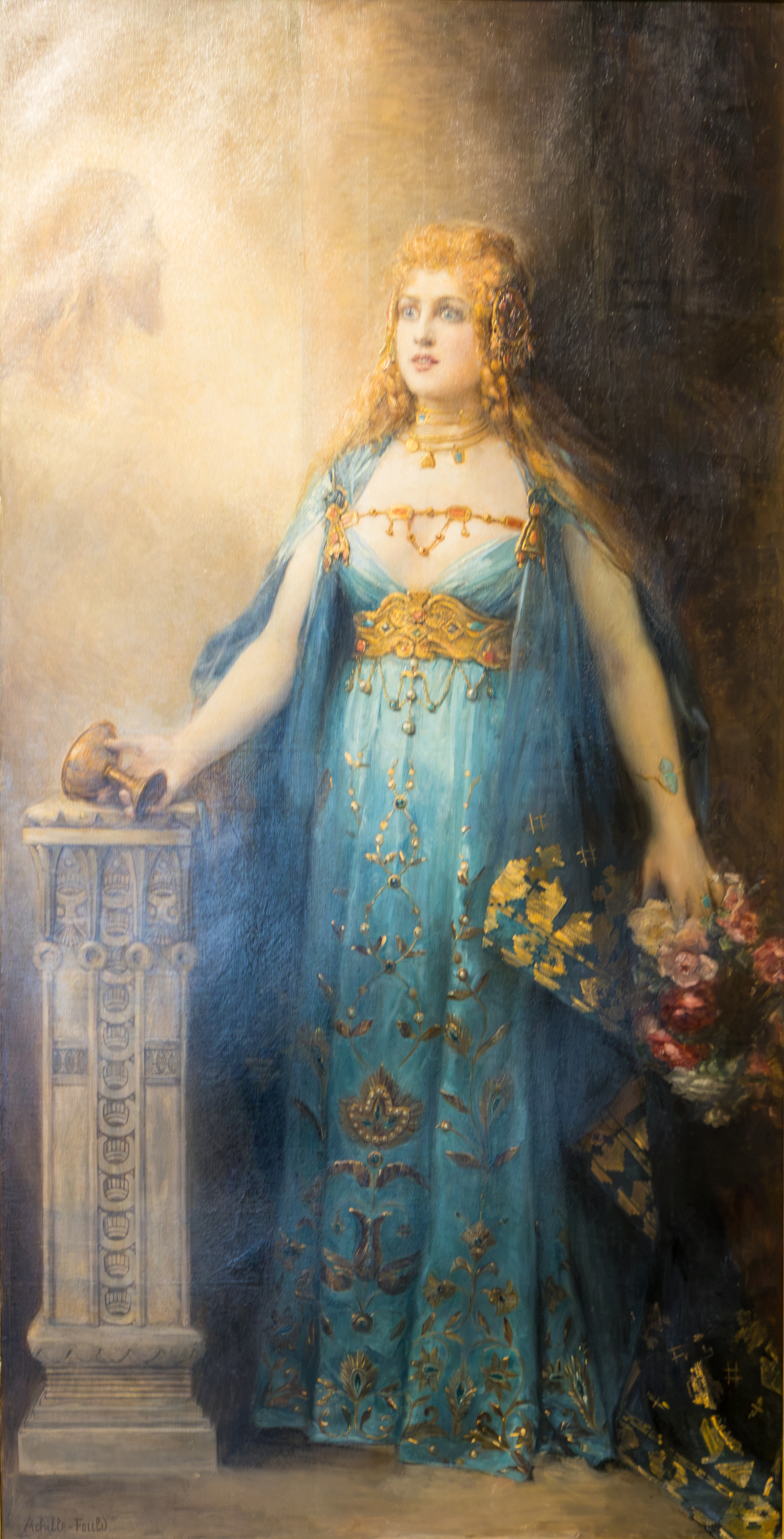
Madeleine repentie, museum Quesnel-Morinière de Coutances.
