= Cilieni =

- Commune
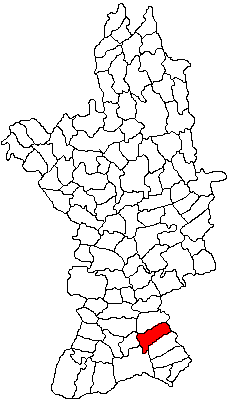
- Location in Olt County

- Location in Romania
- Coordinates: 43°54′11″N 24°36′57″E
- Country: Romania
- County: Olt
- Population (2021-12-01): 2,796
- Time zone: EET/EEST (UTC+2/+3)
- Vehicle reg.: OT
- Website: www.primariacilieni.ro

Cilieni is a commune in Olt County, Oltenia, Romania. It is composed of a single village, Cilieni.
