= Ferdinand Roybet =

French painter

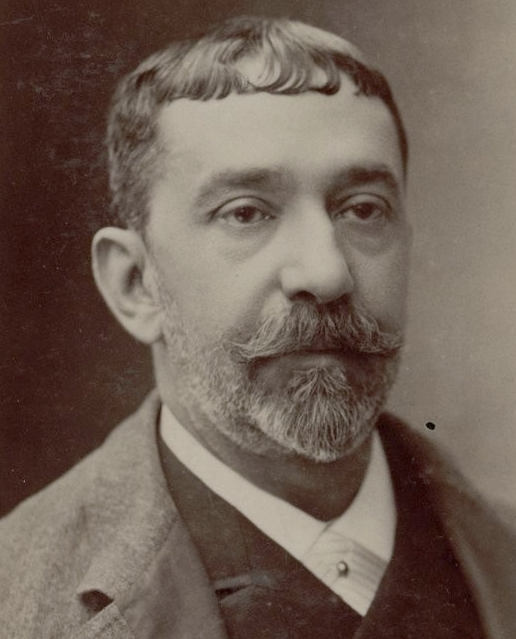
- Photograph of Roybet from the Nadar studios (date unknown)
- Born: Ferdinand Victor Léon Roybet; 12 April 1840; Uzès, France
- Died: 11 April 1920 (aged 79); Paris, France
- Education: École nationale des beaux-arts de Lyon; Jean-Georges Vibert, Paris
- Known for: Painter
- Movement: Orientalist
- Awards: Knight, Legion of Honour, 1893

Ferdinand Victor Léon Roybet (French: [fɛʁdinɑ̃ ʁobe]; 12 April 1840 – 11 April 1920) was a French painter and engraver, best known for his historical and costume genre scenes.

== Biography ==
He was born in Uzès. His father was the owner of a café and a liqueur manufacturer who moved his family to Lyon in 1846. He began by studying engraving at the École nationale des beaux-arts de Lyon. After his father's death in 1863, he took his new wife and baby to Paris, where he studied with Jean-Georges Vibert and copied the Old Masters at the Louvre.

In 1865, after some financial hardships, he presented two paintings at the Salon and, the following year, achieved success when one of his works was purchased by Mathilde Bonaparte for 5,000 francs. He then decided to concentrate on costumed figures, mostly from the 18th century, and was awarded a contract for three canvases per month at an annual salary of 25,000 francs.

Following the Siege of Paris, he embarked on a long period of travelling, visiting Belgium and Algeria. Upon his return, he sold the works he had created for 10,000 francs, settled into a mansion and began collecting antiquities from the Middle Ages and the Renaissance. This eventually led to financial difficulties and his mansion was repossessed by his creditors.

He was named a knight in the Legion of Honour in 1893 and had many wealthy people among his clients – notably Cornelius Vanderbilt, who paid 100,000 francs for one of his works at the Palais de l'Industrie in 1893. He also painted many notable people in period costume, including Count Robert de Montesquiou, Madame Henriette Poincaré and General Joseph Gallieni.

He died in Paris on 11 April 1920. Toward the end of his life, he had turned to religious subjects, producing a tableau of 22 paintings depicting the Passion of Christ. After his death, in 1921, they were the subject of a special showing at the Salon. Six years later, the Musée Roybet Fould was established in Courbevoie by Consuelo Fould, who owned a large number of Roybet's paintings.

== Selected paintings ==
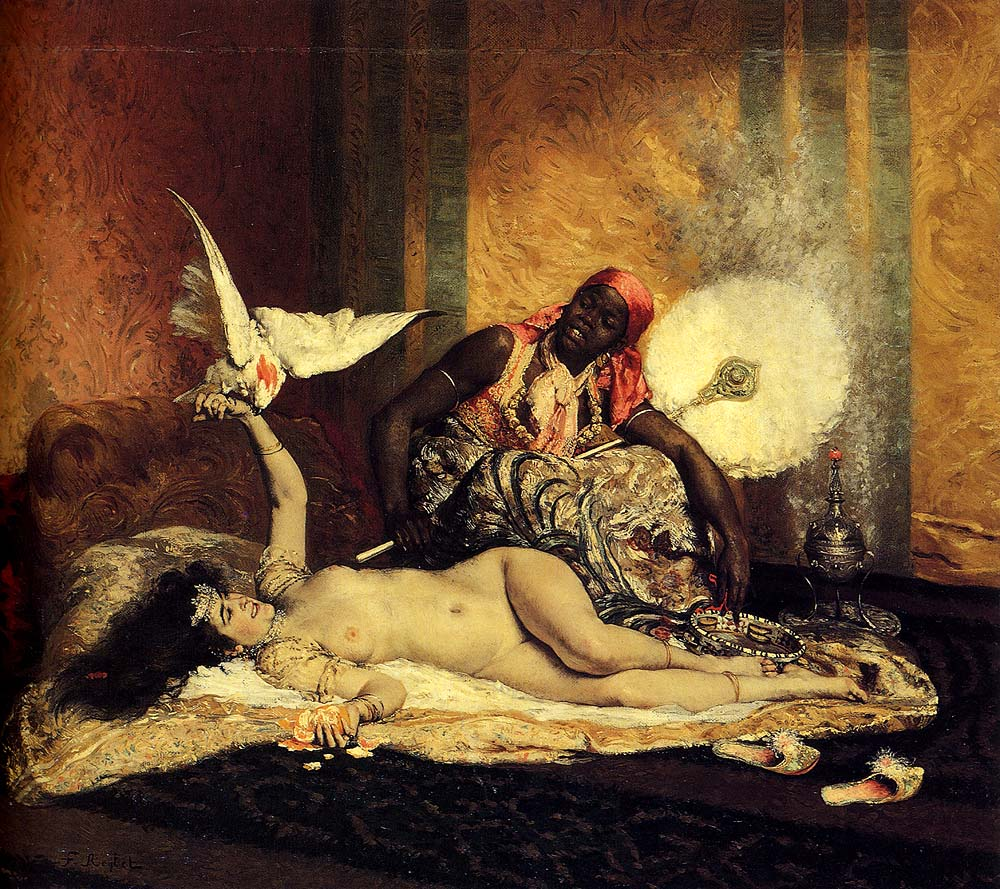
The Sultana

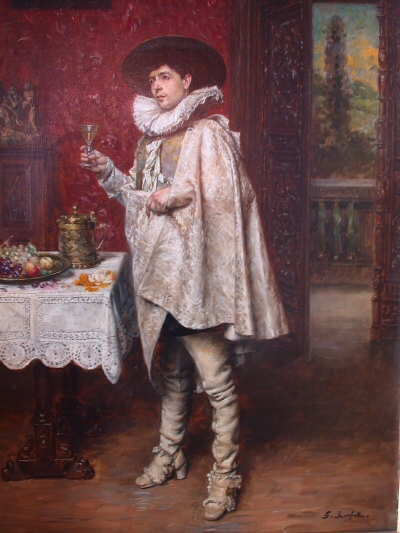
The Musketeer's Meal

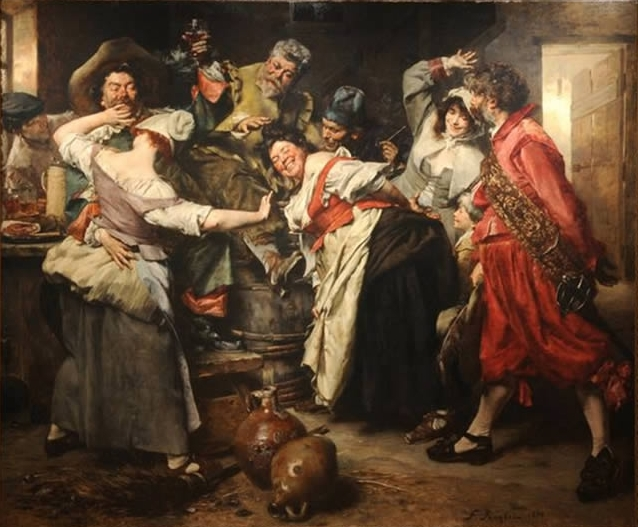
The "Hot Hand" (a game)

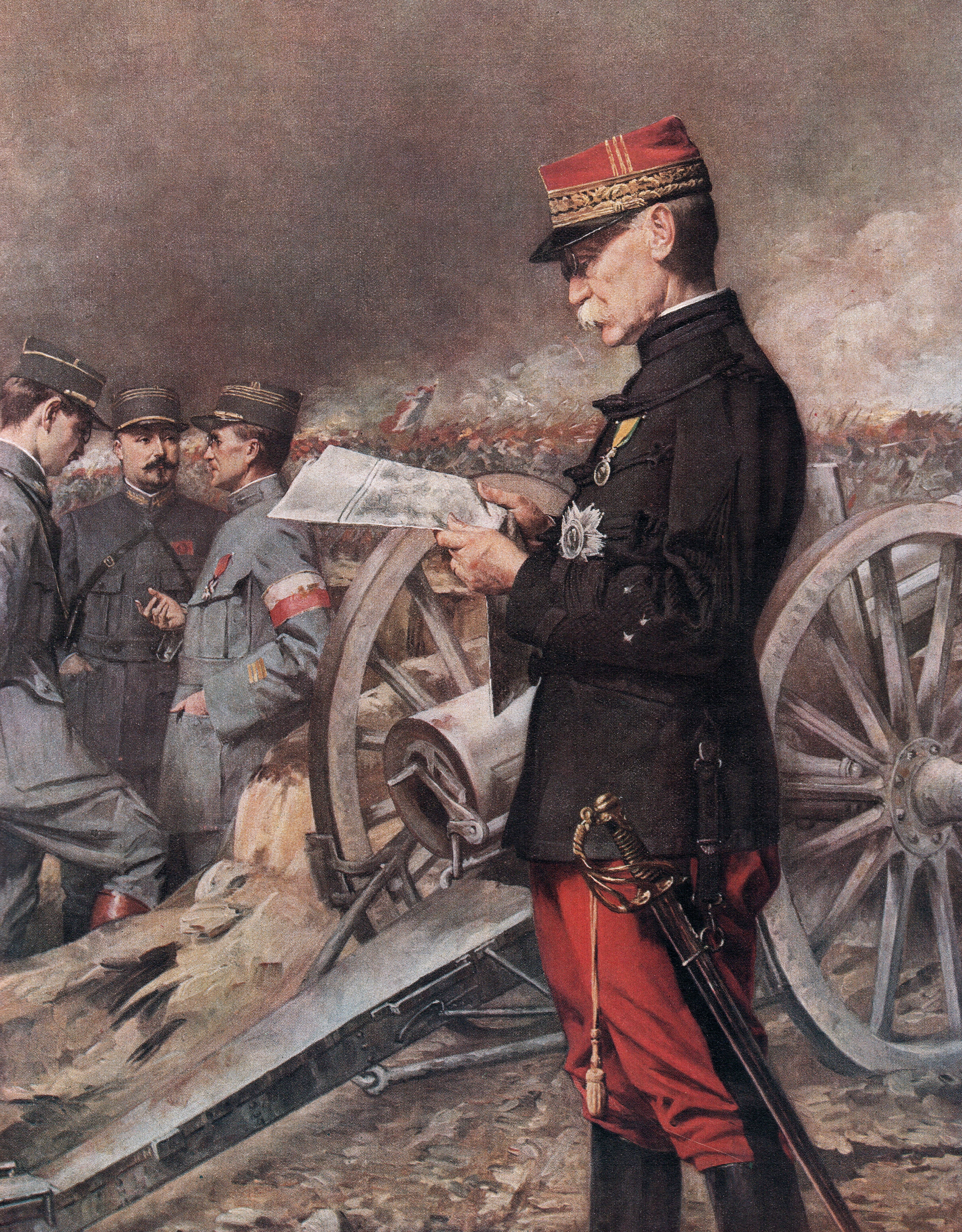
Portrait of General Gallieni

== See also ==
- List of Orientalist artists
- Orientalism
