= Consuelo Fould =

French painter (1862-1927)

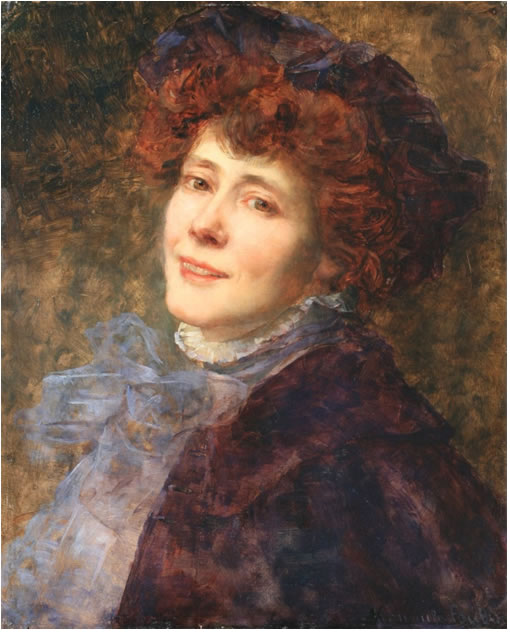
- Self-portrait (c.1890)
- Born: 22 November 1862; Cologne
- Died: 1927 (aged 64–65); Paris, France

Consuelo Fould (French: [kɔnswelo fuld]; 22 November 1862 – 1927) was a French painter.

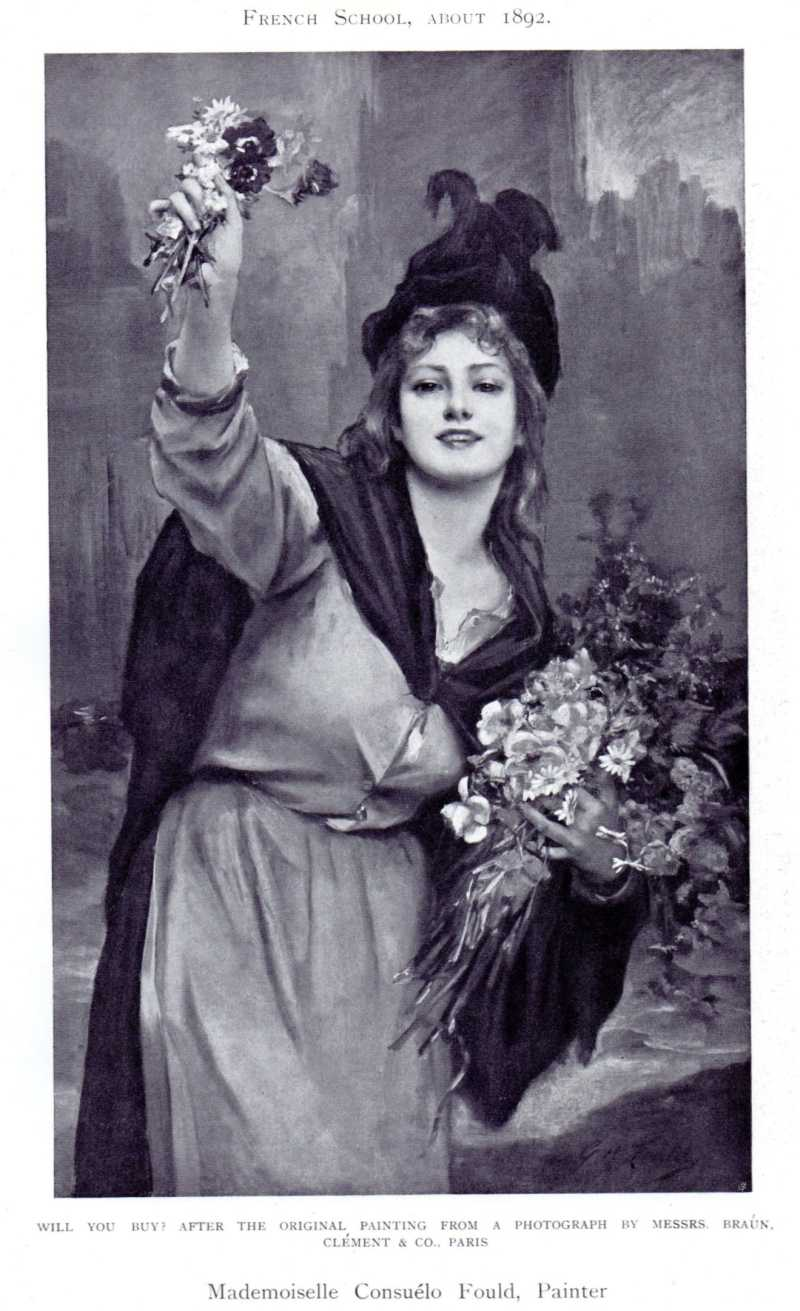
Will You Buy?

Fould was born in Cologne, Kingdom of Prussia, as the daughter of the actress Josephine Wilhelmine Valérie Simonin, better known under her pseudonym Gustave Haller, and politician Gustave-Eugène Fould, of the Fould family of bankers. She was adopted along with her sister, the painter Georges Achille Fould, by the Prince Stirbey.

She was a pupil of Antoine Vollon and Léon Comerre and exhibited at the Paris Salon. Consuelo Fould married the Marquis de Grasse. She was the founder of the Museum Roybet Fould in Courbevoie. She died in Paris.

Her painting Will You Buy? was included in the 1905 book Women Painters of the World.
