= Alexandru Plagino =

Romanian politician

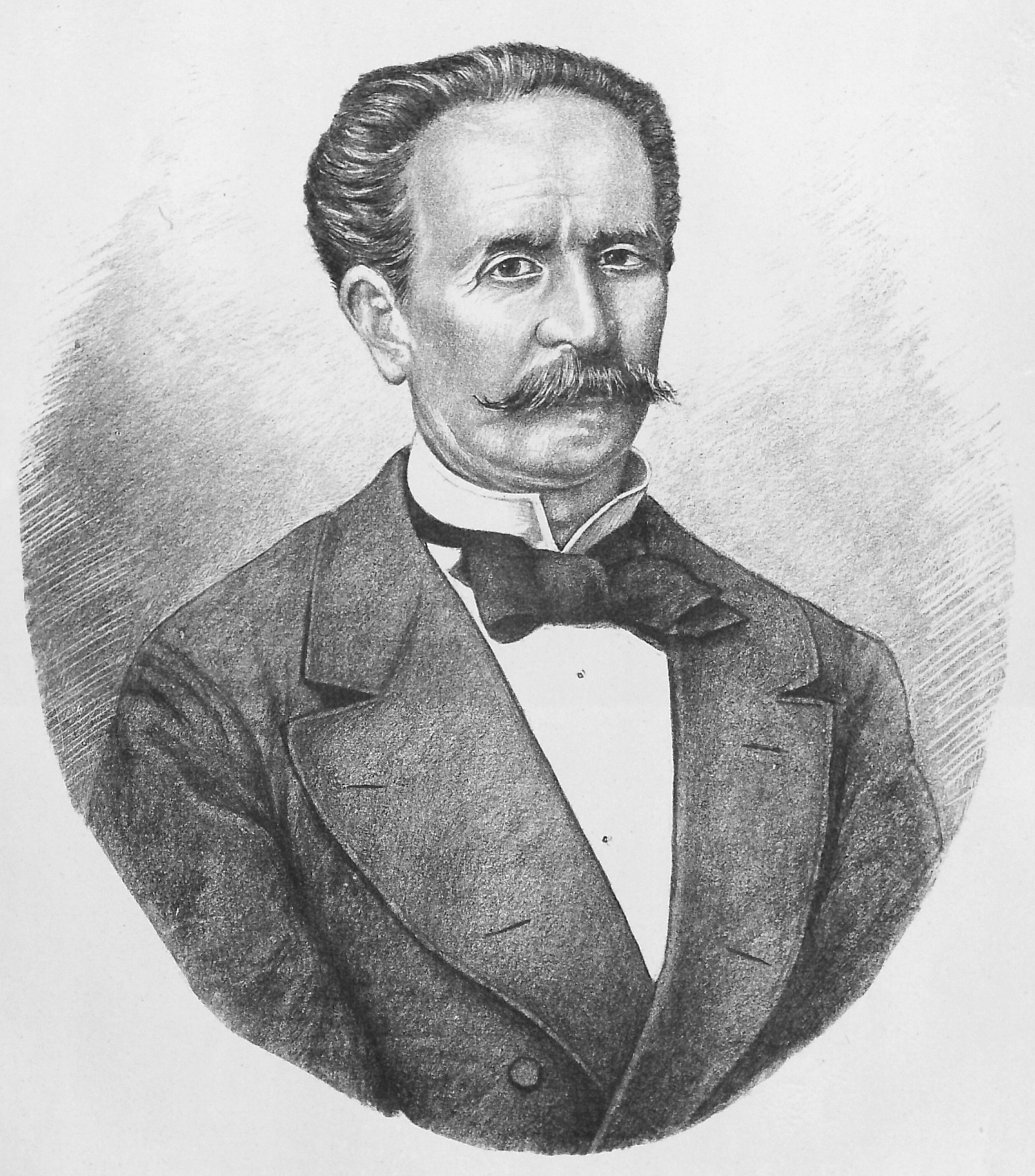
Alexandru Plagino

Alexandru C. Plagino, or Plajino (August 21, 1821 – October 4, 1894), was a Wallachian-born Romanian politician.

Born to a boyar family of Greek origin, his parents were the great postelnic Constantin Plagino and his wife Eufrosina, the daughter of Alexander Mourousis. He became a paharnic in 1840 and an Aga in 1850. Plagino was prefect of the Bucharest police in 1850-1851, and was made great logothete in 1852. He served as state secretary from 1854 to 1856. After the Union of the Principalities, he was Finance Minister in the Wallachian government from July 1861 to January 1862, under Dimitrie Ghica.

Plagino was part of the constituent assembly of 1866, and was elected both senator and deputy (1871). He served as Senate President from September 1869 to March 1871. During the Romanian War of Independence, he served as high commissioner to the general staff of the Imperial Russian Army, from April to July 1877. He was sent to Madrid and Lisbon in order to notify the royal courts there of Romania's independence, spending the year 1879 and early 1880 on the Iberian Peninsula. He was ambassador to Italy from 1885 to 1891, and to the United Kingdom from 1891 to 1893. He died in Plăinești.
