= 1842 Wallachian princely election =

← 1730	December 20–21, 1842 (New Style: January 1–2, 1843)	1859 →

All 188 electoral votes of the Extraordinary National Assembly 95 votes needed to win
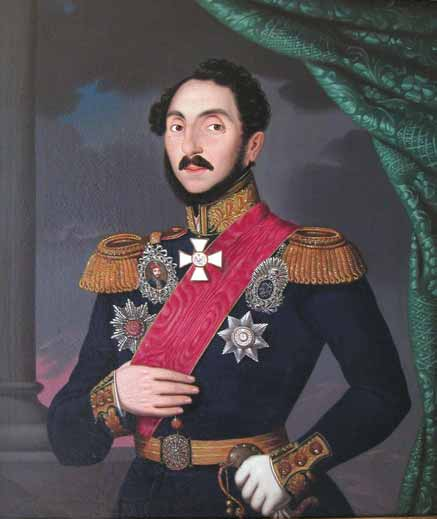

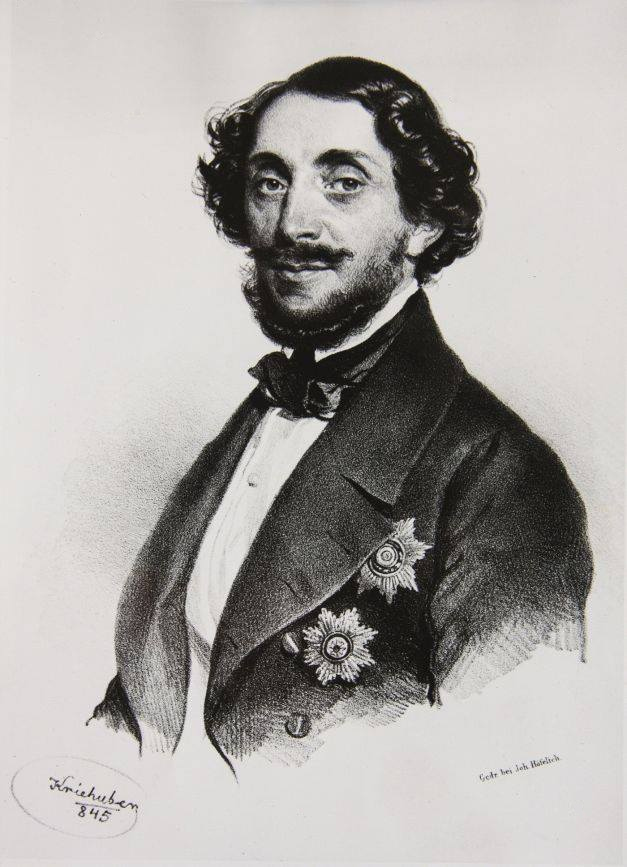

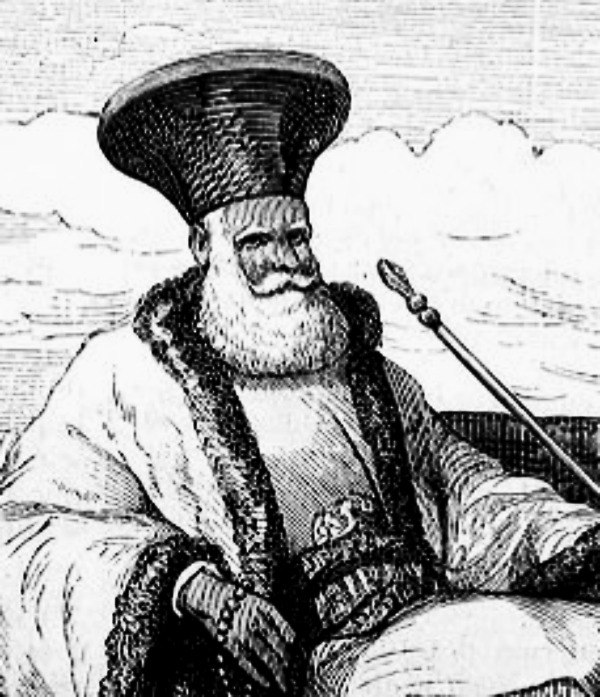
Candidate	Gheorghe Bibescu	Barbu Dimitrie Știrbei	Iordache Filipescu
Electoral vote	131	91	82–84
Percentage	69%	48%	42–44%
Prince before election
vacant
(last: Alexandru II Ghica; Caimacami: Iordache Filipescu, Mihalache Cornescu, Teodor Văcărescu-Furtună)
Elected Prince
Gheorghe Bibescu

Elections for the princely throne of Wallachia were held on December 20–21, 1842 (New Style: January 1–2, 1843), marking the start of Gheorghe Bibescu's rule. They were the first of two such elections ever held in Wallachia, and historic in that they restored and modernized the elective monarchy, after a 112-year hiatus. While earlier elections took place under the Vlach law, the 1842–43 race was held under a modernized suffrage: there were multiple candidates, an electoral college, approval voting, and exhaustive ballot. The selection of voters extended beyond the inner circle of the Wallachian boyars, with consultation of the provincial landowners and the guilds. Such practices reflected the modernizing trend instituted by the Regulamentul Organic regime in both Danubian Principalities, under the shared custody of the Russian and Ottoman empires. In Moldavia, however, the regime did not permit princely elections, making Bibescu's the only Regulamentul reign to have been consecrated by a vote.

The 1842 election also aired disputes between various camps: the National Party versus the Russophiles, and conservatives versus liberals. These protracted battles had marked the rule of Alexandru II Ghica, deposed by collusion between Bibescu and his aging conservative rival, Alecu Filipescu-Vulpea. The electoral campaign, touched by corruption and slander, also opposed Bibescu to his brother Barbu Dimitrie Știrbei, who became a leading contender. Bibescu won when Știrbei effectively transferred him his electoral votes, leaving the senior boyar Iordache Filipescu in third-place.

Bibescu's reign was marked by concessions to the National Party, but later the prince asserted his independence, and, like Ghica before him, governed with a hostile Ordinary Assembly. He also broke with precedent by ruling without consultation and tampering with the legislative elections of 1846, but maintained a friendly rapport with the liberal camp. Eventually abdicating and leaving the country during the Wallachian Revolution of 1848, his brother Știrbei replaced him on the throne following the resumption of Ottoman control. Both brothers remained active in political life after the Crimean War, when, by renouncing their ambitions, they contributed to the union of the Principalities. This was achieved by the princely election of January 1859, when Moldavian Alexandru Ioan Cuza was granted the Wallachian throne.

== Context ==
=== Ghica's ascendancy ===
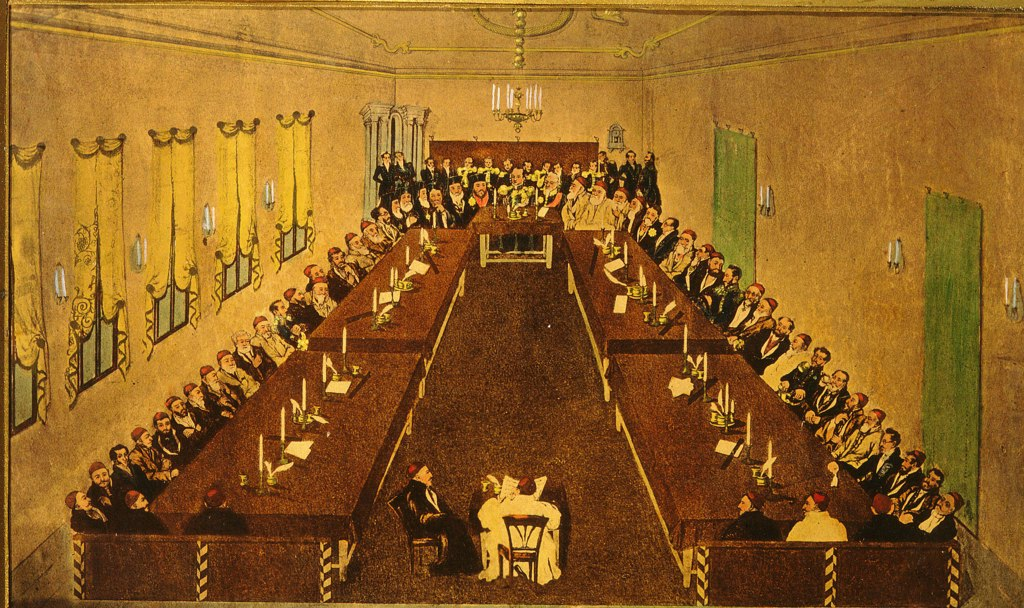
The Ordinary National Assembly, 1831 watercolor

During the early 19th century, both Moldavia and Wallachia were Ottoman vassals ruled upon by Phanariote princes (or hospodars). This era, inaugurated in 1714 by the ouster of Constantin Brâncoveanu, signified "150 years of Greek cultural predominance". This also led to the erosion of the elective monarchy—under the adapted Vlach law of the Middle Ages, electors included the boyardom and all bishops of the Wallachian Orthodox Church, thus opening the way for the erosion of princely powers. The Phanariote regime did away with elections from 1730, when Constantine Mavrocordatos was the last elected prince of Wallachia. Reigning for just one month, he was later restored without elections by Sultan Mahmud I. Although such appointments became the standard, the Phanariote regime developed into a boyar oligarchy, which was largely dominated by the local families—up to 80% of the Boyar Assembly were of indigenous descent. Their opposition to the immigrant Greeks produced the early forms of Romanian nationalism, which seeped into a liberal movement, feeding the Wallachian uprising of 1821 and the social philosophy of Dinicu Golescu.

The Phanariote era came to an abrupt end in 1829, when the Russian Empire occupied both principalities during a war with the Ottomans. The subsequent Treaty of Adrianople called for a new constitutional regime, under shared Ottoman–Russian custody: Regulamentul Organic was drafted by a special Commission of boyars, overseen by the Russian envoys Peter Zheltukhin and Pavel Kiselyov. In obtaining their mix of liberalizing and conservative articles, they repressed both the liberal current and the traditionalist boyars, leading them to compromise on the core issues. Regulamentul was adopted in Wallachia by May 1831, after two years of deliberations. With this, the old Boyar Assembly was refashioned into a 42-member "Ordinary National Assembly", based on the estates of the realm: 20 members were elected by plurality from among the 56 boyars; 18 more, similarly elected, were representatives of the counties, with one additional deputy for Craiova; the other seats were held by the Orthodox bishops. All eligible seats were contested in 1831—"the first time [in Romanian history] when elections were used for producing a deliberative assembly".

Regulamentul and the preceding Akkerman Convention also specified the reintroduction of an elective monarchy to both principalities, but an exception was immediately made under a special protocol between Russia and the Ottomans. In Wallachia, Alexandru II Ghica was appointed prince in March 1834 and anointed in October, his rise curbing that of another favorite, Ban Iordache Filipescu. From its beginnings, the reign was controlled by the Russian Consul, Baron Peter I. Rikman, who imposed his favorites, Barbu Dimitrie Știrbei and Constantin Suțu, as ministers. This episode produced frictions among the boyars and the Russians, exacerbated over the following years. During the legislature of 1836, boyar envoys discovered that sections of Regulamentul had been forged or purposefully left unclear, giving legislative oversight to the Russian envoys. Prince Ghica was mandated by Karl Nesselrode to impose the controversial fragments on the Assembly, but his motion failed to pass, and so he dissolved the Assembly; the new Assembly also refused to accept his version of Regulamentul.

Ghica, in turn, refused to dissolve the Assembly a second time, and Rikman was ordered by his government to seek resolution with the Ottoman partners. As a result of this intercession, Sultan Abdulmejid I issued a firman dissolving the Assembly altogether, and replacing it with a non-elective "ad hoc Divan", comprising only the top 27 boyars of Wallachia. The project never took off because of Rikman's personal failings. His passionate love affair with boyaress Mimica Glagoveanca resulted in her divorce and marriage to Rikman, both of which were facilitated by Prince Ghica, who expected leniency in return. Nesselrode was informed of this and recalled Rikman. Memoirist Grigore Lăcusteanu notes that Ghica's "naive" sexual diplomacy was also attempted, with less success, on Rikman's replacement Vladimir P. Titoff, before the later was replaced by Karl Evstafevich Kotzebue.

=== National Party emergence ===
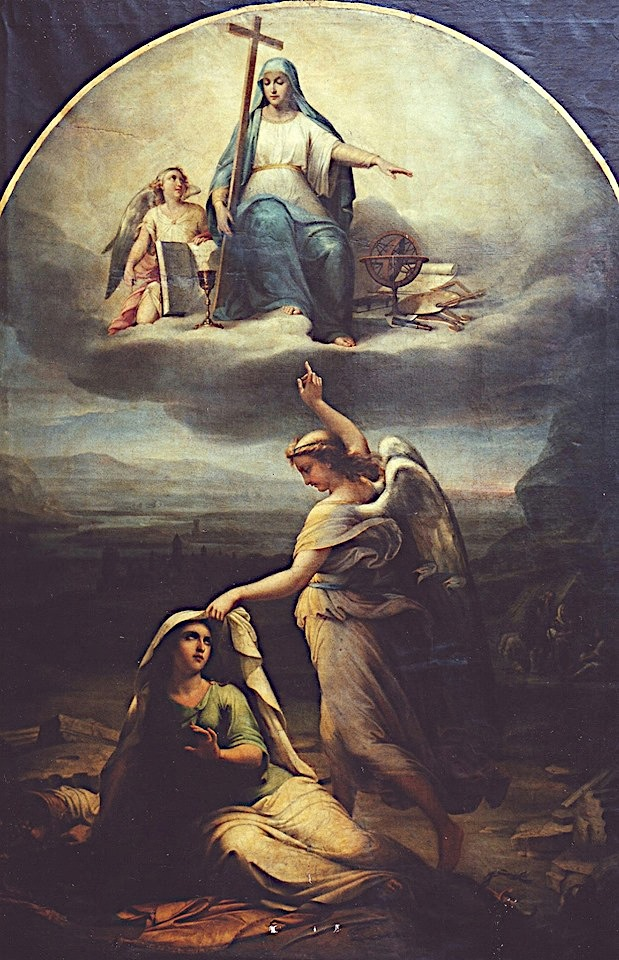
The national awakening of Romania, in an 1850 allegory by Gheorghe Tattarescu

These incidents rekindled nationalism in Wallachia, albeit confined to a relatively small portion of the elite, the "National Party". Its roots reached back to 1798, when Scarlat Câmpineanu and other boyars founded a group of that name, inspired by the French First Republic. Reconstructing the party, Ioan Câmpineanu circulated a constitutional project that would have established a crowned republic, before being publicly shunned and forced into exile. Lăcusteanu, at the time an officer in the Wallachian Militia, claims that: "The aristocracy and the people were Russophiles, words such as 'patriotism' and 'public opinion' were only used by the prince and a couple of boyars." Nevertheless, as noted by scholar N. N. Hêrjeu: "With all their submission to the Muscovites, the boyars quickly understood that Russia only offered them apparent protection, in order to slowly strip them of their privileges. In fact, they hated both the Russians and the Turks." The chronicler Zilot Românul recorded that the boyars were particularly worried by Russian tax farming, which they considered predatory. Among the more powerful boyars, some also opposed the prince, but for purely personal reasons—they included Alecu Filipescu-Vulpea, who had seduced Ghica's divorcee mother, and was therefore detested by the monarch.

Nationalist opposition was also concentrated into cultural projects for the "national awakening", which, as historian A. D. Xenopol writes, were particularly resented by the Russian envoys. In repressing them, Rikman and Kotzebue "did not realize that these were ultimately but mere products, effects, and [they could not hope to] destroy their cause". This period also witnessed the alleged conspiracy headed by the low-ranking boyar Mitică Filipescu in Bucharest. Some months later, a revolt was also raging in Brăila County, where treasurer Andrey Deshov, who reportedly wanted to crown himself or Constantin Suțu as Tsar of Bulgaria, rallied troops to fight against the pro-Ottoman Ghica. The capital was pacified quickly, but the military expedition against Deshov required assistance from Hüseyin Avni Pasha and the Ottoman Army. Both Filipescu and Deshov were sentenced to prison, but the details of their conspiracies remain sketchy. Lăcusteanu, for instance, sees Filipescu as an agent of Russian intrigues, "more Russian than Muscovite Russians", whereas the liberal Ion Ghica insists that he was a patriot and a believer in individual rights.

From 1841, Russia's presence in Wallachia was strengthened by the appointment of a commissioner, Alexander Osipovich Duhamel. He and the prince detested each other, and Duhamel himself was also disliked by Ghica's subjects, who resented in particular his attempts to curb free speech. Ghica himself angered the boyars by celebrating his birthday with 300 promotions of his associates, and allegedly pocketing 11 million French francs from the national treasury. Before the legislative election of 1841, a more conservative opposition group, distinct from the National Party, was slowly emerging among the boyars. It was consolidated around the jurist Gheorghe Bibescu, who had exposed Ghica's favoritism toward foreigners, and had Vornic Alexandru Vilara for its éminence grise. Another affiliate was Barbu Catargiu of Teleorman, who used his maiden speech to denounce Ghica's abuses. Under such influences, the Assembly issued a special report, authored by Bibescu and Filipescu-Vulpea, which depicted Ghica as an anti-patriot, emphasizing his Albanian background. Ion Ghica suggests that his relative was being in fact framed by the Russians, acting in conjunction with Bibescu.

In October 1842, having received the Assembly's formal complaint, Sultan Abdulmejid signed off on Ghica's removal. The prince was informed of this by his physician, Apostol Arsache, and decided to resign before being handed the firman. He exiled himself to the Austrian Empire, and his trip toward the border saw public displays of loyalism. At Ploiești, the citizens offered to reinstate and defend him against foreign invaders. Ghica refused, noting that his "children the Romanians" could not hope to defend the land against two imperial powers. A controversy ensued between those who saw him as a "victim of Muscovite ambitions" and those who believed he was a paragon of corruption.

== Ground rules and campaigning ==
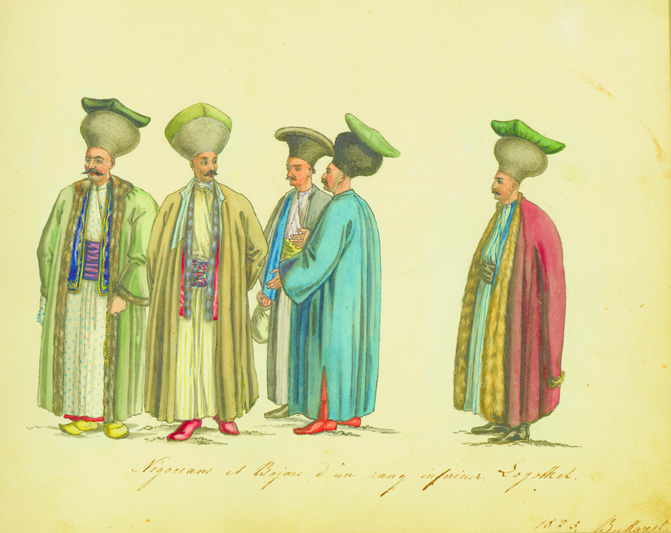
3rd Class boyars and traders of Bucharest (1825 watercolor), included in the sortition of 1842

With Ghica gone, an alliance of the factions, represented by Câmpineanu, Vilara, Filipescu-Vulpea, and Ion Ghica, suggested the appointment of Mihail Sturdza, the reigning Prince of Moldavia, as ruler over Wallachia. This initiative for personal union was quickly vetoed by Russia. Instead, the Sultan designated a regency of three Caimacami: Prince Ghica's rival, Ban Filipescu, alongside Logothete Mihalache Cornescu and Vornic Teodor Văcărescu-Furtună.

In vague terms, the firman also included provisions for the election of a new prince by males of "all classes", seen by boyars and nationalists alike as a restoration of the ancient Vlach law. Election was to be done by an Extraordinary National Assembly, and the Caimacami and the Council of Ministers were tasked with designing rules for the electoral race, beginning with the voting age, set at 30. There were in all 190 or 191 members, a number later set at 188. In accordance with the table of ranks, 50 of these were 1st Class boyars, who were electors ex officio, as were three bishops. 73 more delegates were sortitioned from a pool of 2nd and 3rd Class boyardom, 36 more were elected by the qualified boyars from the counties, with 26 more deputies representing the urban guilds. Bibescu's son and biographer, Georges Bibesco, argues that the representation of guilds and counties meant that the race of 1842 was the first in history to signify election "by the country", being in this more liberal than 18th-century precedents.

Candidates were only eligible if they were 1st Class boyars, aged 40 and over, and fulfilled the grandfather clause: they had to be born in Wallachia, to Wallachian parents, and have a yearly income of at least 2,000 ducats. Voters from the county class also had to be native-born. They were selected among landowning families of that county, with preferential voting done by the four estates of each county. They also could not register in multiple precincts—a restriction which was met with public protest by some of the boyars. Other such restrictions were imposed on the guild voters, who were required to own assets worth at least 5,000 kuruşlar. Bucharest voted 9 such electors through indirect election, and Craiova 3; Ploiești, Roșiorii de Vede, and Râmnicu Vâlcea had 2 each; Buzău, Câmpulung, Caracal, Cerneți, Focșanii Munteniei, Pitești, Slatina, Târgoviște, and Târgu Jiu sent 1 deputy per town.

There were originally as many as 40 candidates, but almost half withdrew for various reasons before the actual ballot. 9 hopefuls were found illegible, including Vilara, Nicolae Golescu, Ioan Manu, Ioan Odobescu, Polkovnik Costache Filipescu (Iordache's son), and the Frenchman Filip Lenj (Linchou). This filtering favored two prominent figures: Bibescu and Știrbei, both of whom were perceived as friendly toward Russia, or, in other records, as champions of the National Party cause. Despite having different surnames and being political opponents, the two were brothers, born to the Vornic of Craiova. Bibescu, who spent those months traveling abroad, was initially stripped of his eligibility, in particular over doubts that he was of the legal age. This was solved by his hastened return and an affidavit from the boyars of Târgu Jiu, who attested that he was born in April 1802, and therefore just over 40. However, Ion Ghica later claimed that Bibescu was not only underage, but also failed the other grandfather clauses, and allowed to run only because he was a Russian favorite.

Among the known anti-Russian, National Party candidates, two were credited with any chances of winning: Iordache Filipescu and Câmpineanu. Also in the race as the "boyar party" candidate, Filipescu-Vulpea was widely perceived as a Russophile, but reportedly claimed that he was in reality a patriot; his only reason for obeying Russia was his fear that Prince Ghica "would have otherwise beheaded me". Lăcusteanu, an elector of the 2nd class, argues that Vulpea, who suffered from hernia, was uncommitted to his own candidacy, but only ran in hopes of making victory more difficult for the brothers Bibescu and Știrbei. He viewed both "Oltenians" as upstarts who would destroy the country. Alexandru Ghica's brother, Costache Ghica, also presented himself as a candidate, probably spurred on by his wife Marițica Văcărescu, who had a dream of becoming Princess. Other relevant candidates included Alecu "Căciulă-Mare" Ghica (half-brother of the deposed prince), Vornic Iancu Filipescu-Buzatu, and the brothers Ștefan and Constantin Bălăceanu. Filipescu-Buzatu was also billed as a National Party candidate, alongside Ștefan Bălăceanu and Emanoil Băleanu.

Lăcusteanu recalls that the campaign was heavily tinged by corruption: "The candidates' salons and luncheons were readily opened. They competed with each other in inviting the deputies over for meals and soirees, then in promises, then in vows that, should one give them the vote, then that deputy would see himself showered with appointments, ranks, protection and various other things. Some would even pay money. One vote could cost them as much as 1,000 ducats. There were also those deputies who cheated: they would pledge themselves to ten or twelve candidates of the most influential category". The candidates also resorted to libel, publishing anonymous brochures in France and Belgium, which they then shipped to Wallachia. These claimed to speak for the national interest, and exposed adversaries as committed Russophiles. A letter carried in La Presse, favoring Bibescu and Știrbei, depicted Iordache Filipescu and Câmpineanu as dubious choices—arguing that the former was "of very meager intelligence", and the latter mentally unstable.

== Results ==
The election took place December 20, 1842 (New Style: January 1, 1843), and was announced to the public with the ringing of church bells "from one end of the Principality to the other". The Extraordinary National Assembly, including members who were candidates, convened at the Metropolitan Hall at 10 AM; voting took place over 24 hours, to 10 AM on December 21 (January 2). The voting procedure used was blackballing with exhaustive ballot: all 21 candidates were randomly split into four "series" or "sections", with three groups of 5 and one group of 6. Electors were made to swear "on the body of Jesus Christ" that they "would only listen to their conscience and to the country's interests." They were also shielded from outside interference by three companies of the Militia, commanded for the day by Neofit II Geanoglu, the Wallachian Metropolitan Bishop. Neofit also led a prayer service in which he released the electors from all pledges to their candidates, inviting them to vote "in clear conscience".

179 or 181 of 188 voters were present, with 8 to 10 electors never showing up. They included Mihalache Ghica, brother of Alexandru and Costache, who was probably absent on purpose. Another voter, the guild deputy Constantin Naneș, was found to be a Roman Catholic, and therefore could not be sworn in by the Metropolitan. According to other records, he was present after being made to swear a special oath at the Franciscan Church of Bucharest. In the end, the 21 candidates taken into consideration still included Căciulă-Mare, who had previously been disqualified, but not Câmpineanu, whom the Russians had intervened to remove from the eligibility list. The procedure was also complicated by multiple pledging and the toleration of approval voting, which made electors cast their votes for more than one candidate. Iordache Filipescu emerged victorious from his series with 82–84 votes in all, while Știrbei, taking 91 votes in his second group, appeared as the likely winner, but with Iancu Filipescu and Căciulă-Mare as major contenders; Ștefan and Constantin Bălăceanu were both out by this stage, the same as Filipescu-Vulpea.

A controversy surrounded the group allocation, with National-Party radicals complaining that Știrbei and Bibescu had been purposefully separated, to increase the chance of either one being elected. The brothers dismissed such rumors as incoherent. Writing a decade later, Franz von Wimpffen recorded an account according to which Bibescu managed to charm his colleagues with his eloquence. Lăcusteanu reports that, in the breaks between rounds, Vornic Vilara campaigned for Bibescu, who was running in the fourth and final series. He tied to inform Știrbei of this, but the latter, fearing vote splitting "between the brothers", allowed Vilara to continue. A similar account was publicized in 1916 by Știrbei's son, George Barbu, who noted that the brothers had a tacit agreement of not letting the "retrograde party" elect a Prince. In his fourth section, Bibescu therefore claimed an absolute majority of 131 votes—73% of the turnout, 69% of possible votes. Overall, the race was as follows:

Series 1 candidate	Ballots
Iordache Filipescu	82–84
Alecu Filipescu-Vulpea	61–63
Teodor Văcărescu-Furtună	29
Alexandru Scarlat Ghica	19
Costache Golescu	8
Series 2 candidate	Ballots
Barbu Dimitrie Știrbei	91
Ștefan Bălăceanu	36
Iancu Văcărescu	21
Dimitrie Hrisoscoleu	12
Mihalache Racoviță	10
Series 3 candidate	Ballots
Emanoil Băleanu	75–79
Constantin Cantacuzino	41
Costache Ghica	35–39
Constantin Cornescu	27
Constantin Bălăceanu	20
Series 4 candidate	Ballots
Gheorghe Bibescu	131
Alecu "Căciulă-Mare" Ghica	60
Iancu Filipescu-Buzatu	49
Grigore Grădișteanu	31
Manolache Florescu	24
Iordache Florescu	8

== Aftermath ==
=== Bibescu's reign ===
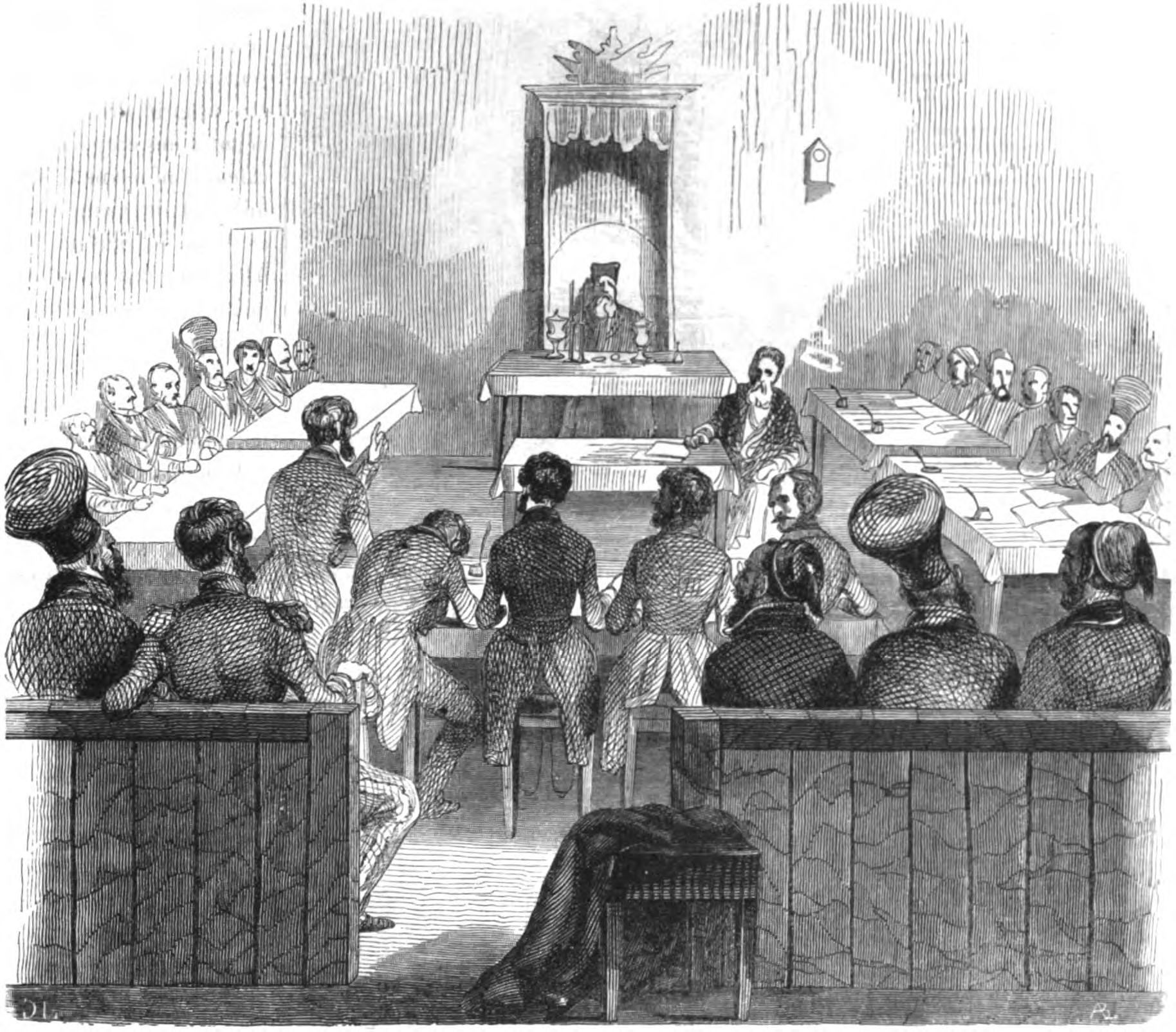
An Ordinary Assembly debate of the 1840s

Within two weeks, the new prince earned recognition from Russia, with Emperor Nicholas I informing Wallachians that Bibescu's selection, a "guarantee of wise, regular and loyal administration", "honors the Assembly". His enthronement included the first oath of office in Romanian history, and an affirmation of autonomy: when visiting the Sultan to be confirmed, Bibescu refused to wear the fez, and would not prostrate before his overlord. Instead, he went on pilgrimage to Dealu Monastery, paying his homage to the reliquary hosting the head of Michael the Brave. An unsigned poem mocked him over this choice, depicting Michael the Brave disgusted at having been "kissed by a wicked devil." After taking the throne, Bibescu encouraged economic growth and the "fast civilizing" of his country, his limited protectionism being discarded when he proposed, and obtained, a customs union with Moldavia. Bibescu also initiated the first steps toward the abolition of Roma slavery, and limited the corvée.

Despite such nationalist-and-liberalizing overtures, within two years of his election the prince was in open conflict with the estates of the realm. A public scandal began during the coronation ceremony, when Bibescu fell in love with Marițica Văcărescu, who was still married to his unsuccessful rival Costache Ghica. After expressing his intention of divorcing Zoe Brâncoveanu and marrying Marițica, Bibescu had a publicized row with Metropolitan Neofit. His nepotism was by then notorious, leading to intense criticism from the boyars, only enhanced by Bibescu's attempt to curb tax evasion. More significantly, Bibescu also clashed with the National Party and the Assembly, over his project of leasing Wallachia's mines to a Russian entrepreneur, Alexander Trandafiloff. Although it was prompted by a generous bid, this move inspired fears that Wallachia would be overrun with cheap Russian labor, and that it was a precedent for expropriations. It also alienated some of Bibescu's conservative backers, including Catargiu, while giving impetus to the liberal movement.

Up to the very end of his rule, Bibescu favored an understanding with the liberals, showing himself ready to usurp privilege: in 1848, he proposed that boyars engaging in commerce be required to apply for letters patent. According to Lăcusteanu, Marițica made Bibescu into a "superlatively vain" character, one likely to flirt with the liberals who promised him the imperial throne of "Dacia". The country, he claims, was actually governed, "very well", by Vilara. Bibescu eventually dissolved the Assembly, and reigned as an absolute monarch for two more years; when he accepted new elections in 1846, he skewed the results by blocking multiple votes and also by filtering out hostile candidates. In 1847, Alexander Osipovich Duhamel returned as commissioner—according to Lăcusteanu, his mission was to instigate liberal revolts and thus justify a complete Russian takeover.

=== Revolution and beyond ===
The clashes between liberals and conservatives eventually produced the Wallachian Revolution of 1848. It is depicted by the conservative Lăcusteanu as one "of the petty schoolteachers, the lawyers, the rapacious upstarts [and] the boyar sons", the urban masses having been incensed by both Duhamel and the deposed ruler Ghica. Initially welcoming the radicals, Bibescu abdicated under street pressure, then fled to safety in Austria. The uprising had a set of republican ideals, with a democratized elective monarchy—goals expressed in the Proclamation of Islaz. However, it did not effect complete institutional changes, only establishing a Revolutionary Government that included, in its earliest stages, Bibescu's rival Câmpineanu as Caimacam. This collective leadership was eventually brought down by an Ottoman–Russian invasion, co-led by Mehmed Fuad Pasha, Abdülkerim Nadir Pasha, and Alexander von Lüders, with the only battle being fought over Dealul Spirii.

The Convention of Balta Liman restored and partly modified Regulamentul, suspending elections for the post of prince. Știrbei was handpicked by Abdulmejid to serve a seven-year term. The Assembly, now called "National Divan" and preserving primarily consultative functions, was made up of unelected bureaucrats, judges, and bishops. This regime was also perturbed by the Crimean War and an Austrian occupation, at the end of which Wallachia and Moldavia came under a collective supervision of the European powers. Ghica returned to govern as Caimacam, this time with full Ottoman support, and after various intercessions in his favor. The ad hoc Divan was convened under the Treaty of Paris, reviving popular consultation with an extensive suffrage, which now offered representation to the peasantry; the main issue on its agenda was unification with Moldavia as the "United Principalities", the basis of modern Romania. The election of September 1857 produced a Divan in which both Bibescu and Știrbei, again as leaders of competing factions, were elected deputies.

While conservative and liberal unionists were both challenged by the Convention of Paris, which reduced suffrage and stipulated that the two countries would be united in name only; a Wallachian prince was scheduled to be elected in January 1859. Both Știrbei and Bibescu were again prominent among the candidates. However, a series of coordinated actions by the National Party ensured the election of Alexandru Ioan Cuza, a Moldavian, effectively creating a personal union between the two Ottoman vassals. The election of 1843, alongside the 1859 assembly and its Moldavian counterpart, endures as the only instance of elective monarchy in modern Romanian history (with a partial exception being the April 1866 referendum).
