= Ioan Manu =

Romanian politician

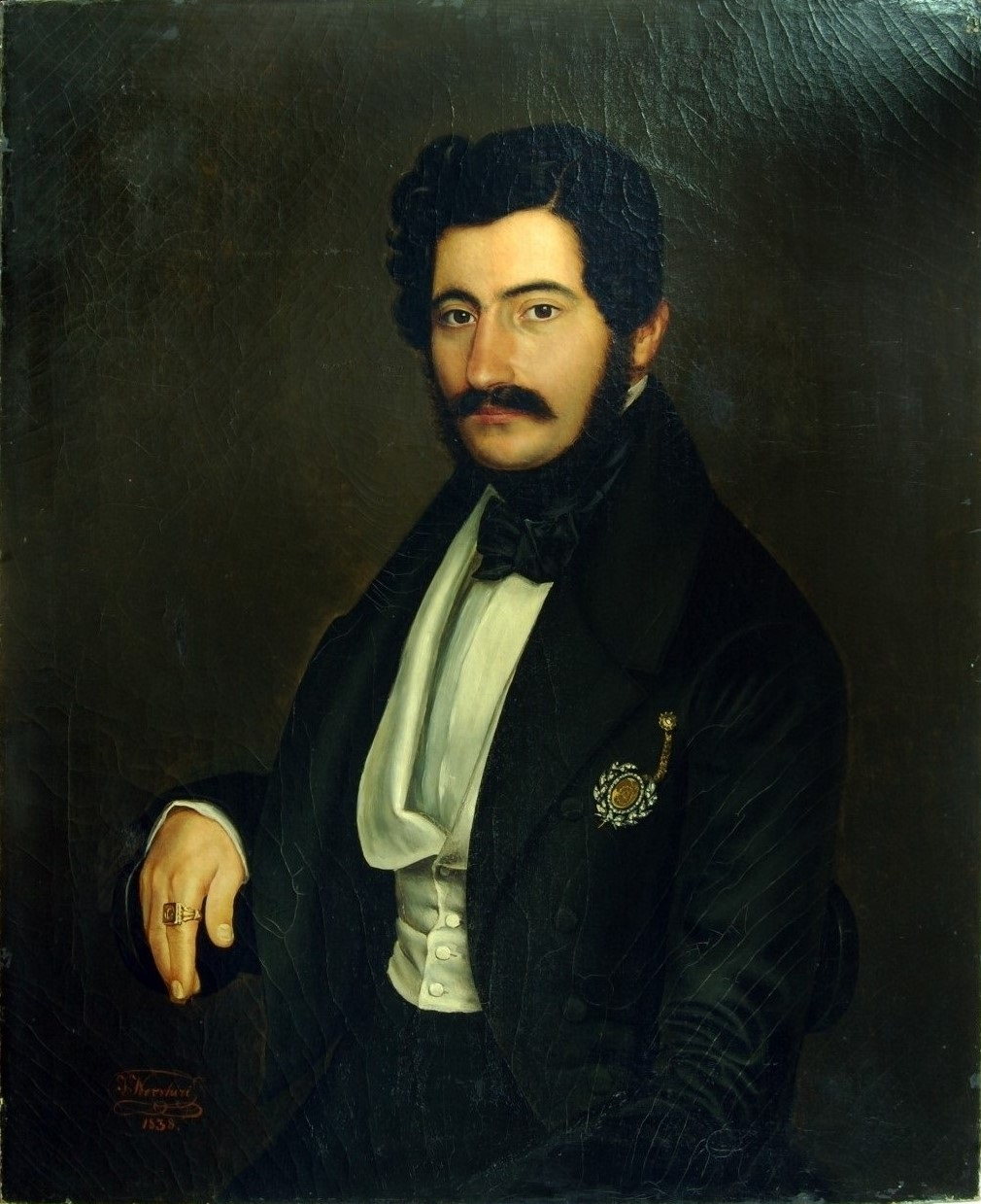
Portrait of Iancu Manu by Ion Negulici.

Ioan M. Manu, also known as Iancu Manu (June 24, 1803 – November 29 O.S., 1874), was a Romanian boyar and politician.

== Biography ==
He was the son of Mihail G. Manu, born into a family of Venetian origins that had moved from Istanbul to Wallachia in the mid-18th century, where it was one of the noble families of Phanariotes. Ioan Manu studied at home and then at the Romanian school of Ion Heliade Rădulescu, Simeon Marcovici and others.

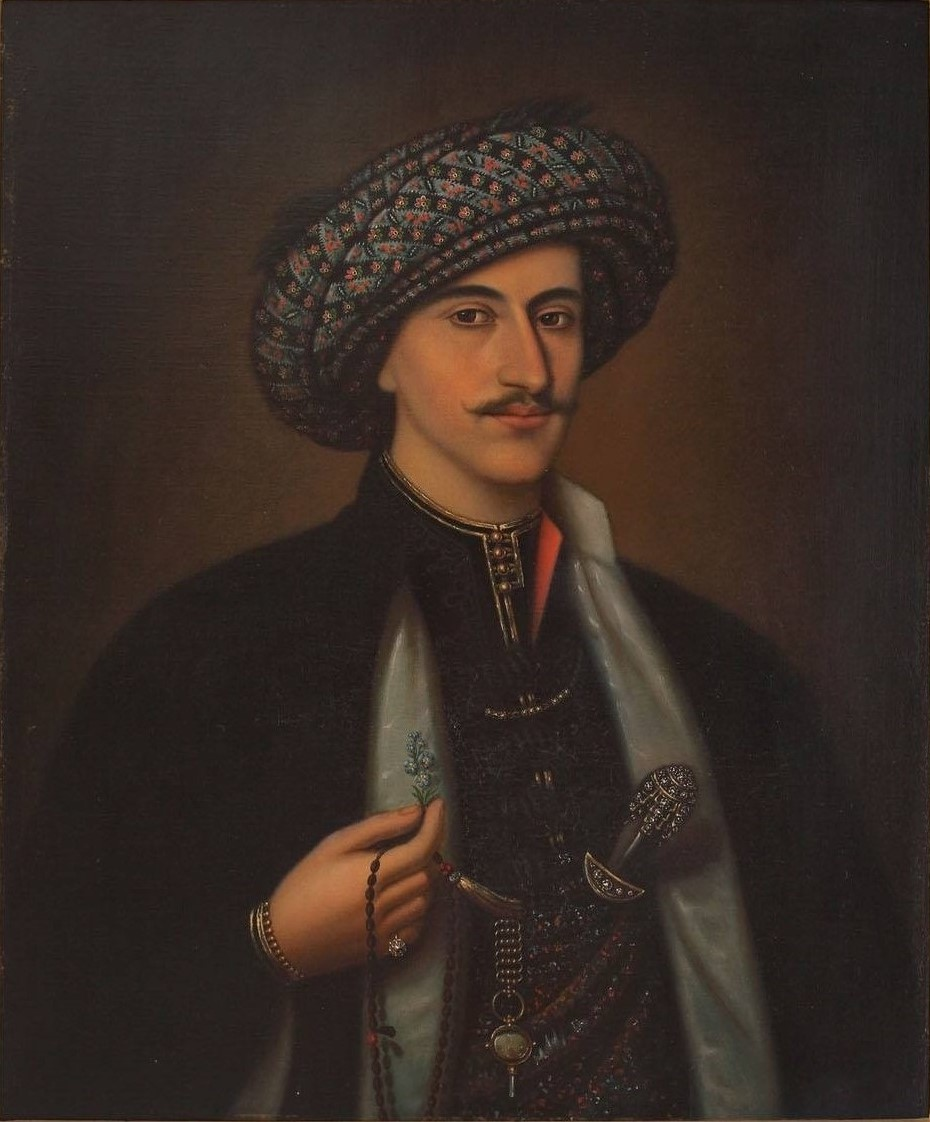
Ioan Manu, 1820s

During the rule of Imperial Russian governor Pavel Kiselyov (see Regulamentul Organic), he was a prefect of Galaţi, then a prefect of Giurgiu and in 1833, he settled in the capital Bucharest, holding several offices in succession: a Vornic during the reign of Prince Alexandru II Ghica, a secretary of the National Assembly, and an Aga (prefect of police) during the reign of Gheorghe Bibescu (when he organized the first Firefighters' Corps in Wallachia). In exchange for his leadership during the Great Fire of Bucharest (1847), Manu was awarded a "sword of honour" by the city.

During the 1848 Wallachian Revolution, he fled the country, returning after some time, but staying out of politics for a while. He later became a Postelnic (Foreign Minister) during the reign of Barbu Dimitrie Ştirbei. In his political activity, Manu climbed all the boyar ranks, eventually reaching the highest one, that of Great Vornic.

In 1858, after the Crimean War removed the country from Russian overseeing, he was, with Emanoil Băleanu and Ioan Al. Filipescu, one of the three Caimacams who administered Wallachia pending the election of a new prince by the ad hoc Divan. In 1859, he supported the former prince Bibescu instead of Alexandru Ioan Cuza, and, during the latter's rule as Domnitor of the United Principalities, he retired from public life. Manu returned only when Carol I replaced Cuza, being elected a member of the Parliament of Romania in the first electoral college (that of landowners), as a representative of Ilfov County.
