= Elisabeta Știrbey =

Princess consort of Wallachia

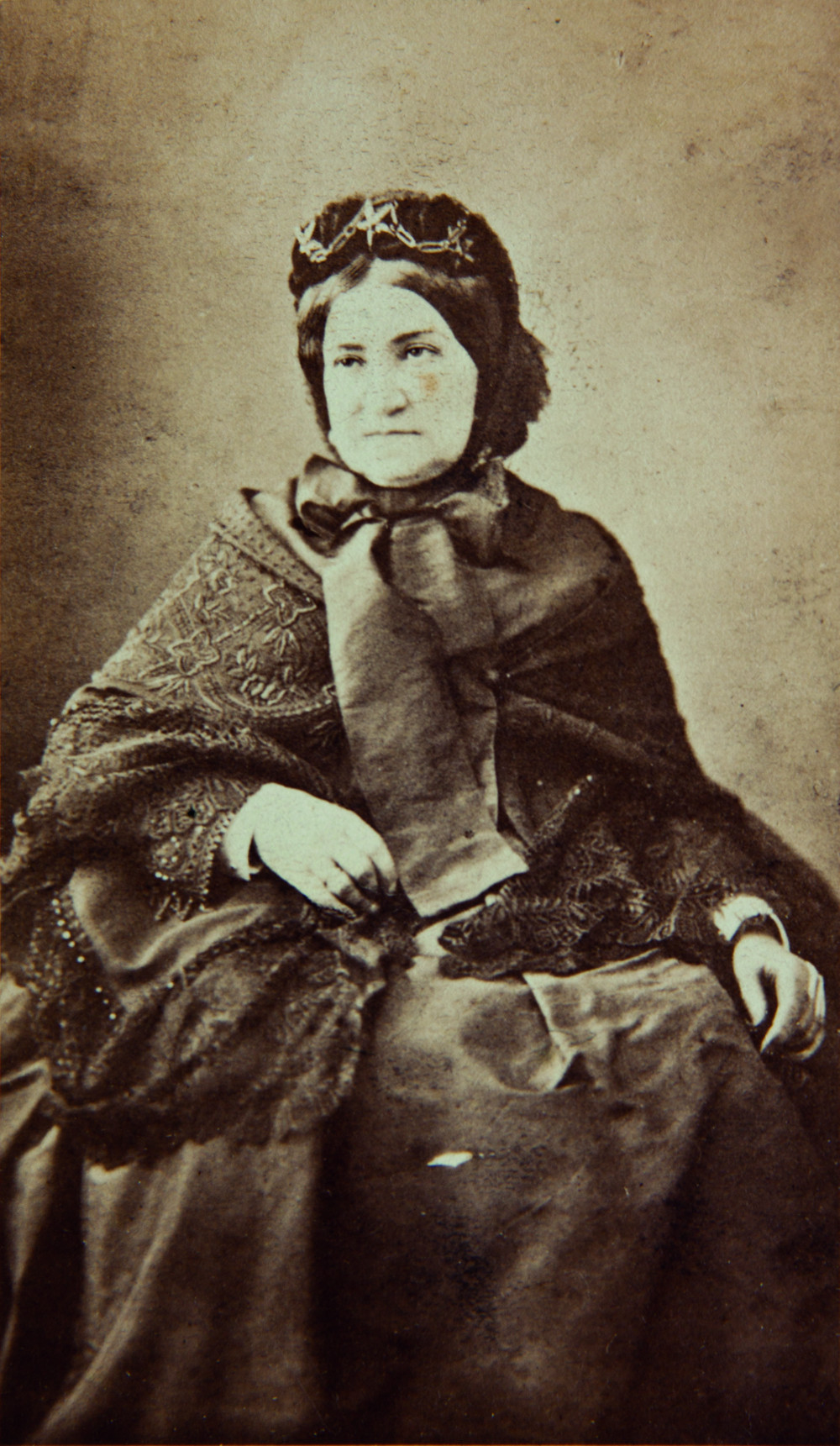

Princess consort of Wallachia
- Reign: June 1848 - 25 June 1856
- Born: 1805
- Died: 1875 (aged 69–70)
- Spouse: Prince Barbu Dimitrie Știrbei
- House: Cantacuzino-Pașcanu
- Father: Prince Grigore Cantacuzino-Pașcanu
- Mother: Princess Elena Brâncoveanu

Elisabeta Știrbey (1805–1874), was a Princess consort of Wallachia.

== Early life ==
Born into an old Phanariote noble family which claimed descent from Byzantine Emperors, she was the daughter of Prince Grigore Cantacuzino-Pașcanu (1779–1808) and his wife, Princess Elena Brâncoveanu (1787–1809), descendant of Constantin Brâncoveanu.

== Biography ==
From 1825, Elisabeta and her husband lived in Bucharest, where their palace at the Calea Victoriei became a center of social life, where she became known for the grand balls she regularly arranged. She was also a noted philanthropist. In 1839, she had French educational work by Jeanne Campan translated to Romanian, and in 1843, she founded the first Romanian language school for girls.

== Personal life ==
In 1820, she married Prince Barbu Dimitrie Știrbei, the son of Boyar Dumitrache Bibescu, Palatine of Wallachia (1772–1831), and his wife, Ecaterina Văcărescu (1777–1842). They had:

- Princess Fenareta Stirbey (1822–1894); married Prince Theodor Ghica (1820–1865) and had issue
- Princess Elize Stirbey (1827–1890); married Ştefan Bellu (1824–1902) and had issue
- Princess Elena Stirbey (1831–1864); married Count Leo Larisch von Mönnich (1824–1872) and had issue
- Prince Alexandru Stirbey (1836–1895); married Princess Maria Ghica-Comănești (1851–1885) and had issue
- Prince Dimitrie Stirbey (1842–1913); married Alexandrine von Soyka (1857–1931) and had issue
