= Alexandru II Ghica =

Ruler of Wallachia

- Prince of Wallachia
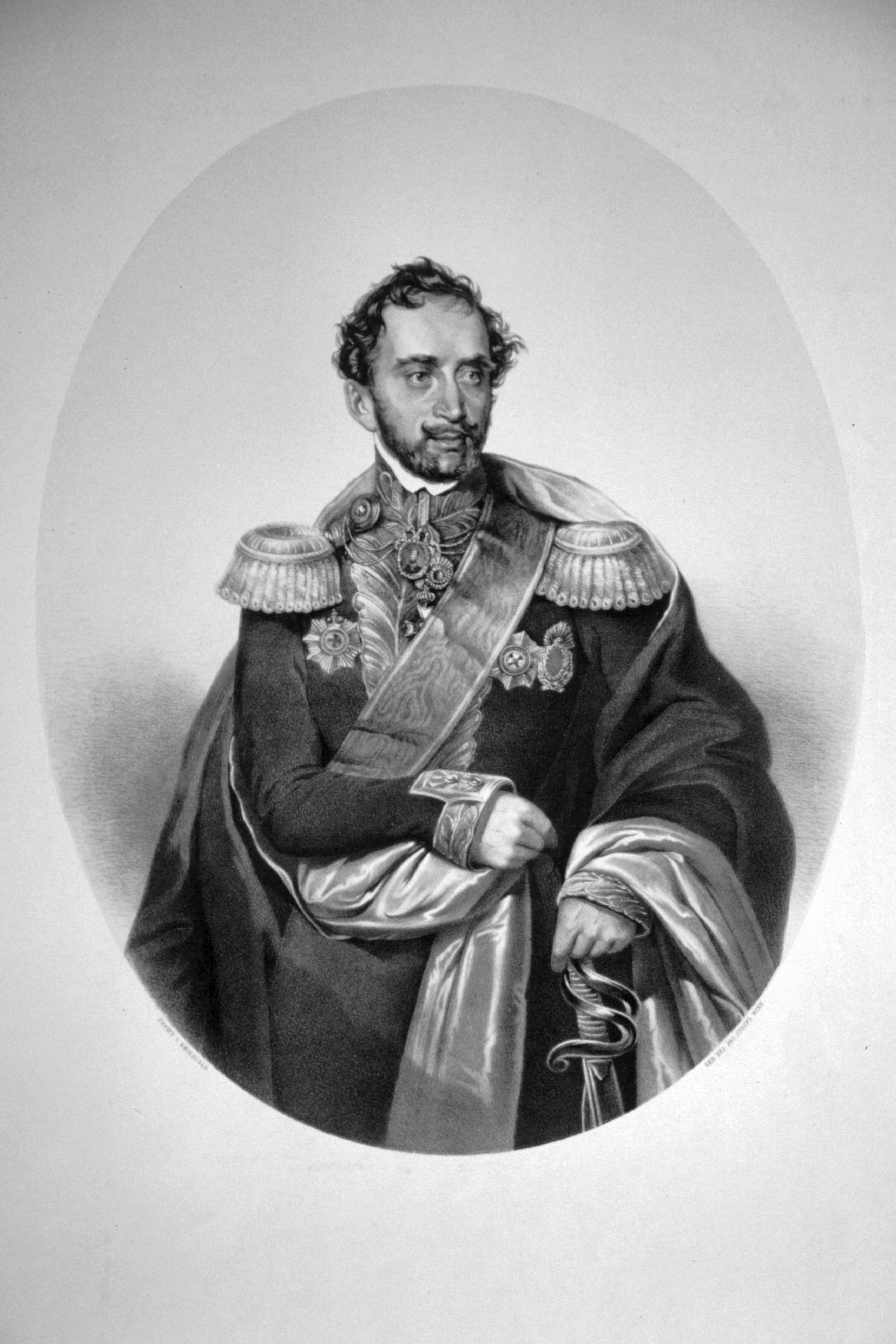

Prince of Wallachia
- Reign: April 1834 – 7 October 1842
- Predecessor: Grigore IV Ghica
- Successor: Gheorghe Bibescu
- Born: May 1, 1796
- Died: January 1862 (aged 65); Naples
- House: Ghica family
- Father: Demetriu Ghica
- Mother: Eufrosine Caradja
- Religion: Orthodox

Alexandru Dimitrie Ghica (1 May 1796 – January 1862), a member of the Ghica family, was Prince of Wallachia from April 1834 to 7 October 1842 and later caimacam (regent) from July 1856 to October 1858.

== Family ==
He was son of Demetriu Ghica and Eufrosine Caradja. His brothers were Grigore IV Ghica and Michai Ghica, father of Elena Ghica (pen-name Dora d'Istria).

== Biography ==
Alexandru was appointed jointly by the Ottoman Empire and Russia (1834–1842) as hospodar of Wallachia. Under him the so-called règlement organique had been promulgated; an attempt was made to codify the laws in conformity with the institutions of the country and to secure better administration of justice.

At the end of his reign as Prince of Wallachia, he was replaced by the Russian-backed Gheorghe Bibescu.

He died in Naples in 1862.

| Preceded by Russian occupation | Prince of Wallachia; 1834–1842 | Succeeded by Gheorghe Bibescu |
| Preceded by Austrian occupation | Caimacan of Wallachia; 1856–1858 | Succeeded by Ioan Manu; Emanoil Băleanu; Ioan A. Filipide |

== Bibliography ==
- Ghica, Ion (1905). Scrisori către V. Alecsandri (in Romanian). Leon Alcalay – via Google Books.
- Xenopol, Alexandru Dimitrie (1897). Istoria și genealogia casei Callimachi (in Romanian). Tip. Curții Regale, F. Göbl FII.
- de Haan, Francisca; Daskalova, Krasimira; Loutfi, Anna (2006-01-01). Biographical Dictionary of Women's Movements and Feminisms in Central, Eastern, and South Eastern Europe: 19th and 20th Centuries. Central European University Press. ISBN 978-963-7326-39-4.
- Iorga, Nicolae (1906). Studiĭ și documente cu privire la Istoria romînilor (in Romanian, German, Latin, and Italian). Vol. 11–12. Editura Ministeriuluĭ de Instruct̨ie Publică.
- Sturdza, Alexandru A. C. (1904). La terre et la race roumaines depuis leurs origines jusqu'à nos jours (in French). L. Laveur.
