= Gheorghe Bibescu =

Romanian prince (1804–1873)

- Prince of Wallachia
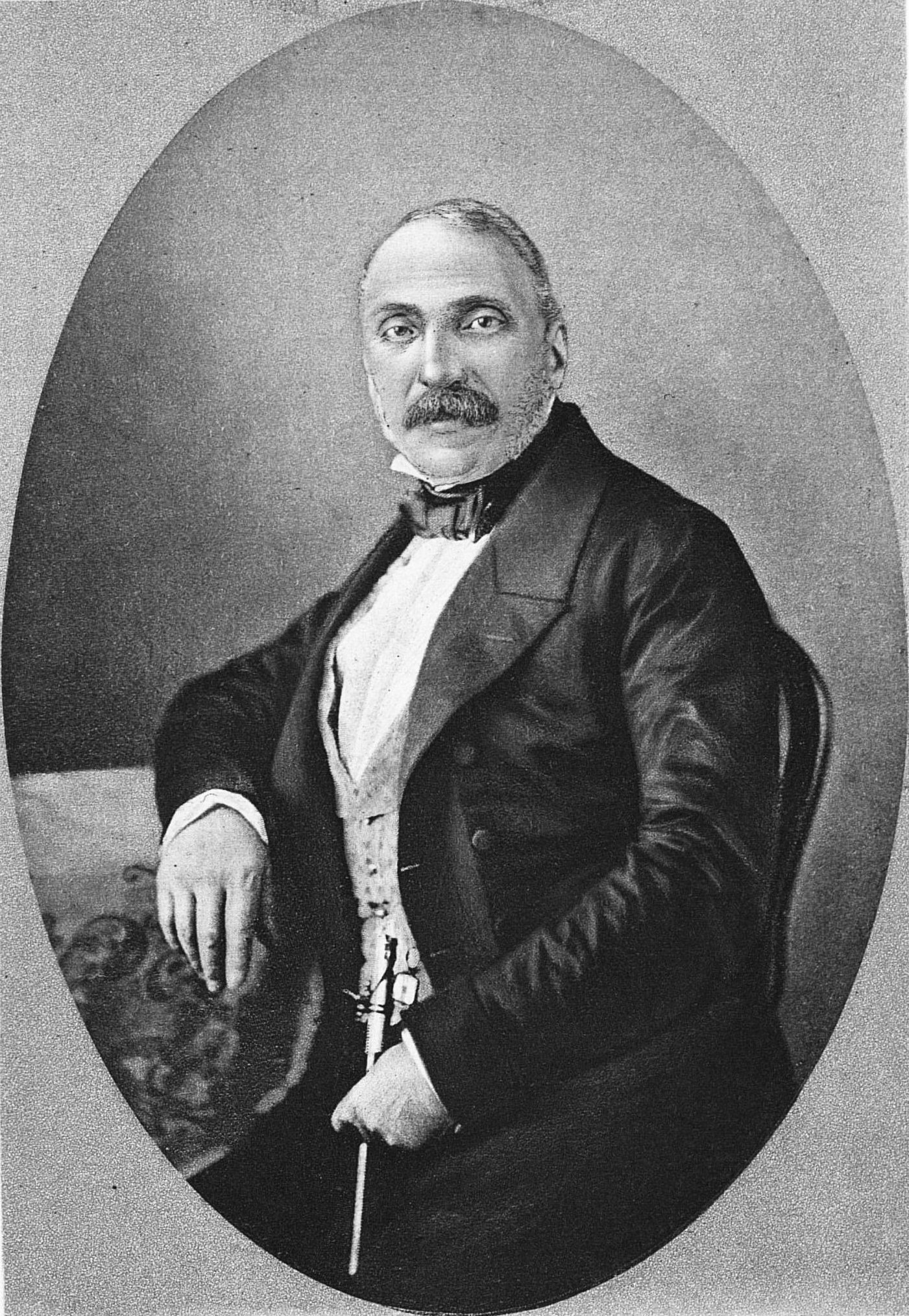
- Portrait, c. 1860

Prince of Wallachia
- Reign: 1 January 1843 – 25 June 1848
- Predecessor: Alexandru II Ghica
- Successor: Barbu Dimitrie Știrbei
- Born: 26 April 1804; Craiova, Wallachia
- Died: 1 June 1873 (aged 69); Paris, France
- Spouse: Zoe Brâncoveanu; Marițica Bibescu
- Issue: Grégoire Bibesco-Bassaraba
- Father: Dimitrie Bibescu
- Religion: Orthodox

Gheorghe Bibescu (Romanian pronunciation: [ˈɡe̯orɡe biˈbesku]; 26 April 1804 – 1 June 1873) was the hospodar (prince) of Wallachia between 1843 and 1848. His rule coincided with the revolutionary tide that culminated in the 1848 Wallachian revolution.

== Early political career ==
Born in Craiova as the first son of Dimitrie Bibescu, a member of the Bibescu boyar family, he studied Law in Paris. After his return to Wallachia, he was elected deputy in the Extraordinary Public Assembly, the legislative forum established by the Imperial Russian overseers at the end of the Russo-Turkish War of 1828–1829, representing the Dolj County during the Pavel Kiseleff administration. He subsequently took on different offices, including that of secretary of state. Before his election as hospodar, he was seen as an opponent of his predecessor, Alexandru II Ghica.

== Hospodar of Wallachia ==
=== Election ===
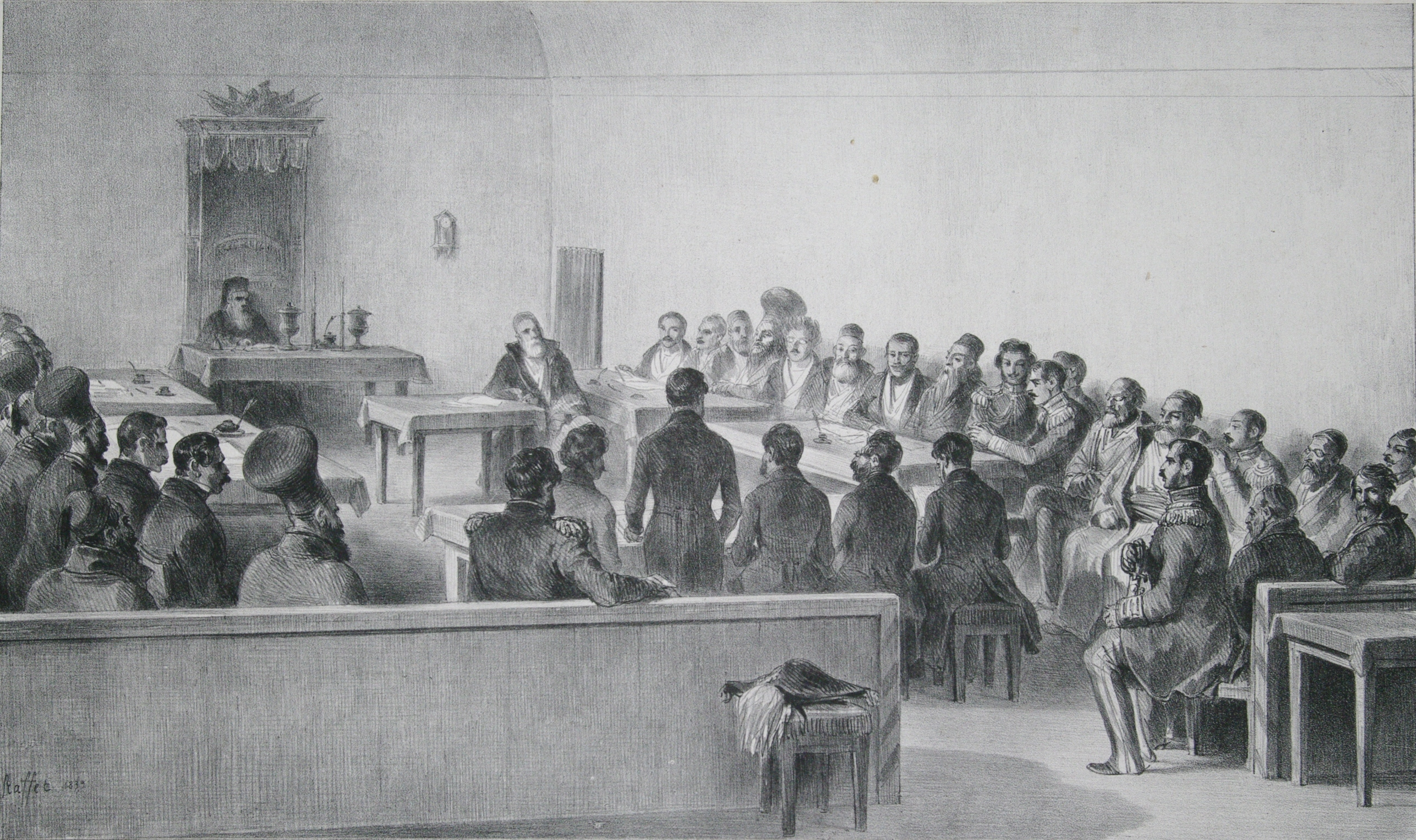
The Wallachian Assembly in 1837

On 1 January 1843, the first (and only) elections carried out in accordance with the Organic Statute took place in Wallachia; these were carried out by a representative assembly, and had been prompted by Ghica's abuse. Of many candidates, Bibescu and his older brother, Barbu Ştirbei, were the most popular choices with Imperial Russia. Bibescu was elected hospodar, supported by both the conservative boyars and the younger liberals. One of his first gestures in office was to grant pardon to radicals who had conspired against Ghica (including Mitică Filipescu and Nicolae Bălcescu).

Bibescu did not change the government immediately after the election, as it was made up mostly of Ghica's political adversaries. However, his relations with the Public Assembly started to deteriorate due to disagreements on several legislative projects.

== The Trandafiloff affair and dissolution of the Assembly ==
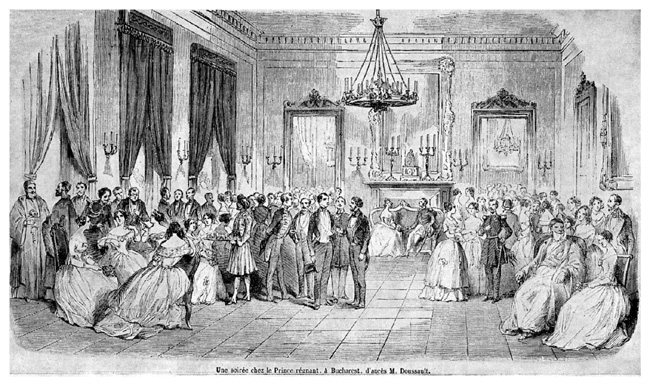
A soirée at the Princely Palace, 1843

In the spring of 1844, the Wallachian government approved the request of the Russian engineer Alexander Trandafiloff, to be allowed to administer the country's mines (which were subject to private ownership). Moreover, if any mine owner did not begin extracting from their mines within 18 months, the Russian company was to take over the administration of the mines for 12 years, by paying 10% of the income to the owner and 10% to the Wallachian state.

Bibescu approved the contract, but the Public Assembly protested against it: the deputies saw it as an intervention of the protecting power in local politics. The contract was eventually cancelled, but, caught between the Assembly's position and the Russian authorities, on 4 March 1844, Bibescu dissolved the Public Assembly with the approval of Russian Emperor Nicholas I. When elections for the body were convened in November 1846, he used several means to silence opposition, thus awarding himself a subservient legislature. A clear separation between him and Romantic nationalists occurred when he ordered the refoundation of the Saint Sava College as a French-language school — based on his view that Romanian was incompatible with modernization.

Two and a half years after that, Bibescu passed laws for public works and public administration. In the summer of 1844, he took a long trip through the country in order to inspect the public institutions and local authorities in the major cities.

=== On the eve of the Revolution of 1848 ===
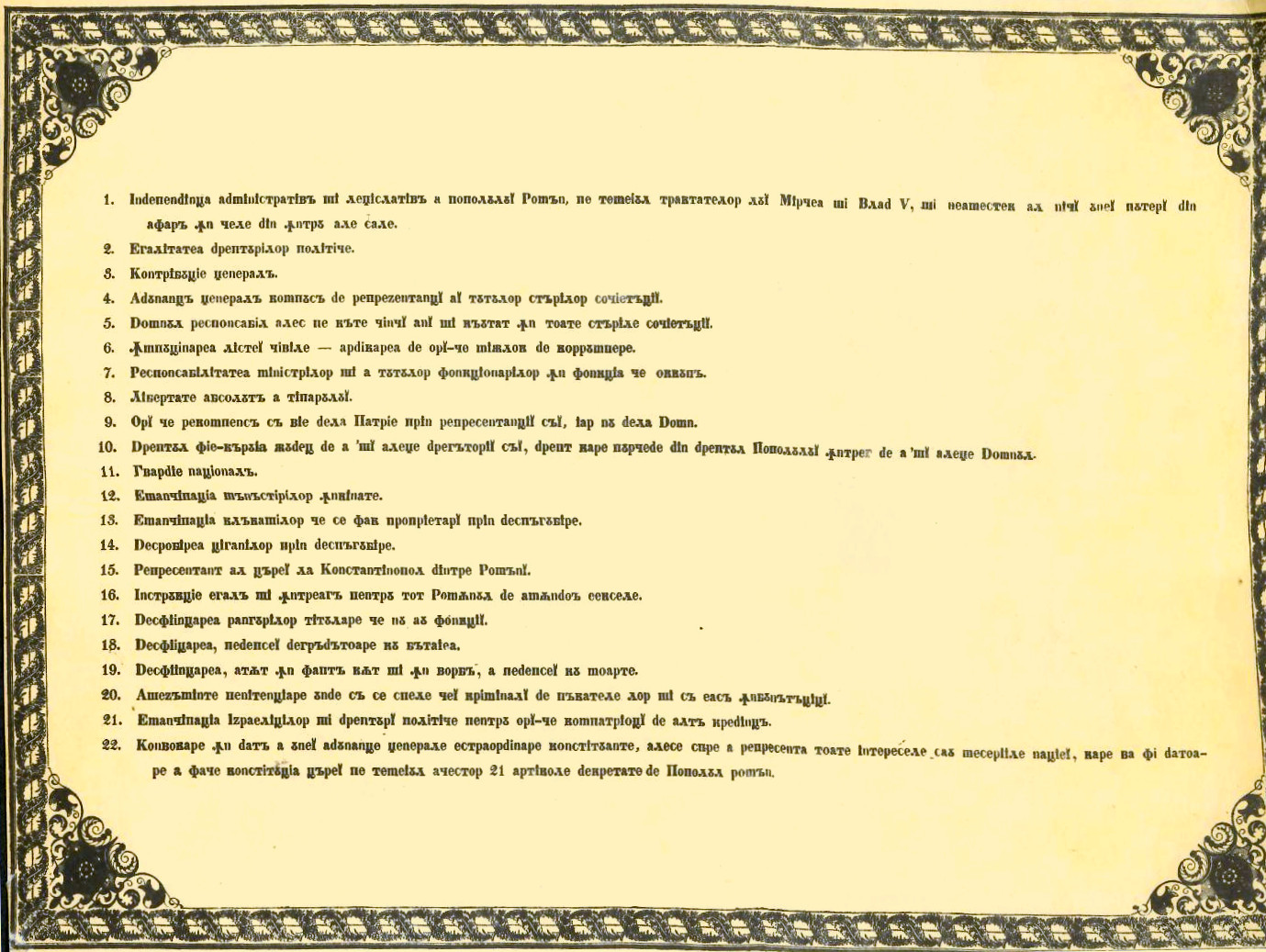
The Islaz Proclamation

In December 1846, he was advised by Kiseleff to call for new Public Assembly elections. The elections brought a new Assembly dominated by politicians loyal to the hospodar. With this legislature, Bibescu passed several important laws, such as a new law on the Eastern Orthodox clergy, one that allowed the hospodar to approve the church budget, and a law freeing all the Gypsy slaves who belonged to the church and to the public authorities.

Gheorghe Bibescu worked for better relations with Moldavia (the other Danubian Principality under Russian supervision), and, starting 1847, the two countries established a customs union, after an agreement with Mihail Sturdza, the Moldavian hospodar. This was the culmination of his attempt to remove Wallachia's traders and guilds from foreign competition (see Sudiți), first manifested in his project to increase taxes on foreign goods.

Bibescu also convinced the Russian government to allow him to impose some taxes on those monasteries that had been dedicated to various Orthodox centers of worship outside the Danubian Principalities' territories (the ownership issue, stringent ever since the end of the Phanariote epoch, implied that church property eluded state intervention, channelling income towards places such as Mount Athos; it was to be settled through secularization under the rule of Alexandru Ioan Cuza).

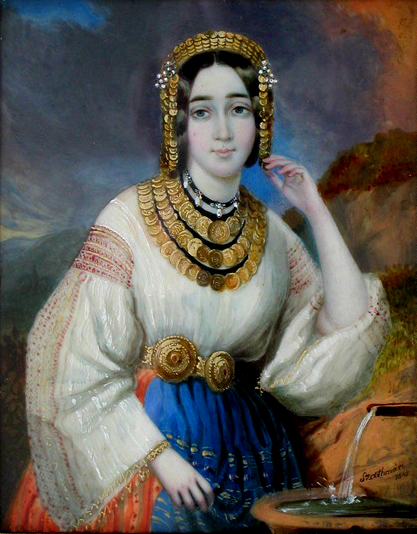
Maria Văcărescu-Bibescu

In the summer of 1848, the revolution broke out. Initially, Wallachian radicals had unsuccessfully attempted to attract Bibescu to their side. They then issued the Islaz Proclamation of 9 June 1848. On 11 June Gheorghe Bibescu accepted the proclamation; two days later he abdicated and left the country, leaving it to be ruled by a Provisoral Government which succumbed to Ottoman intervention in September. In 1859, Bibescu was presented as candidate to the throne by the conservatives who opposed Wallachia's union with Moldavia.

He died in Paris.

== Personal life ==
Gheorghe Bibescu was married to Zoe Brâncoveanu, the last of the Brâncoveanu family, therefore inheriting all the titles and wealth. The marriage was unsuccessful, as Zoe became mentally ill. Bibescu entered into a conflict with the Orthodox Church, as he wanted to divorce Zoe. He eventually managed to obtain the divorce in 1845 and in September of the same year, he married Maria Văcărescu, in Focșani.

The Brâncoveanu patrimony passed on to Zoe and Gheorghe Bibescu's son, Grégoire Bibesco-Bassaraba (the father of Anna de Noailles).

== Notes ==
Preceded by Alexandru II Ghica	Ruler of Wallachia; 1842–1848	Succeeded by Barbu Dimitrie Ştirbei
