= Barbu Dimitrie Știrbei =

Prince of Wallachia (1799–1869)

- Prince of Wallachia
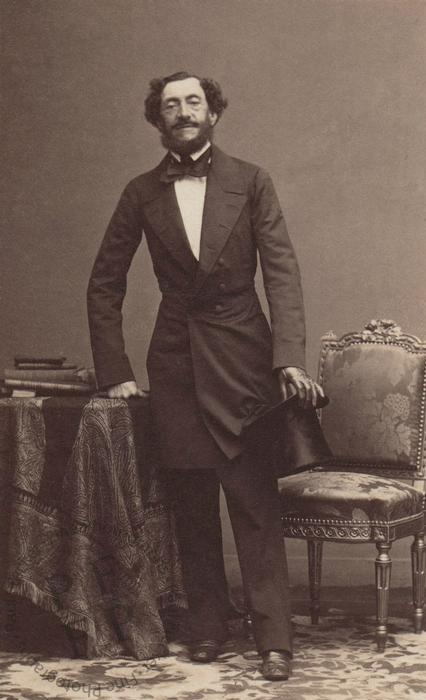
- 1861 portrait

Prince of Wallachia (1st reign)
- Reign: June 1848 – 29 October 1853
- Predecessor: Gheorghe Bibescu
- Successor: Russian occupation

Prince of Wallachia (2nd reign)
- Reign: 5 October 1854 – 25 June 1856
- Predecessor: Russian occupation
- Successor: Alexandru Ioan Cuza
- Born: 17 August 1799; Craiova, Wallachia
- Died: 13 April 1869 (aged 69); Nice, France
- Spouse: Elisabeta Cantacuzino (m. 1820)
- Issue: Fenareta; Elize; Elena; Alexandru; Dimitrie
- House: Știrbei
- Father: Dumitrache Bibescu
- Mother: Ecaterina Văcărescu
- Religion: Eastern Orthodoxy

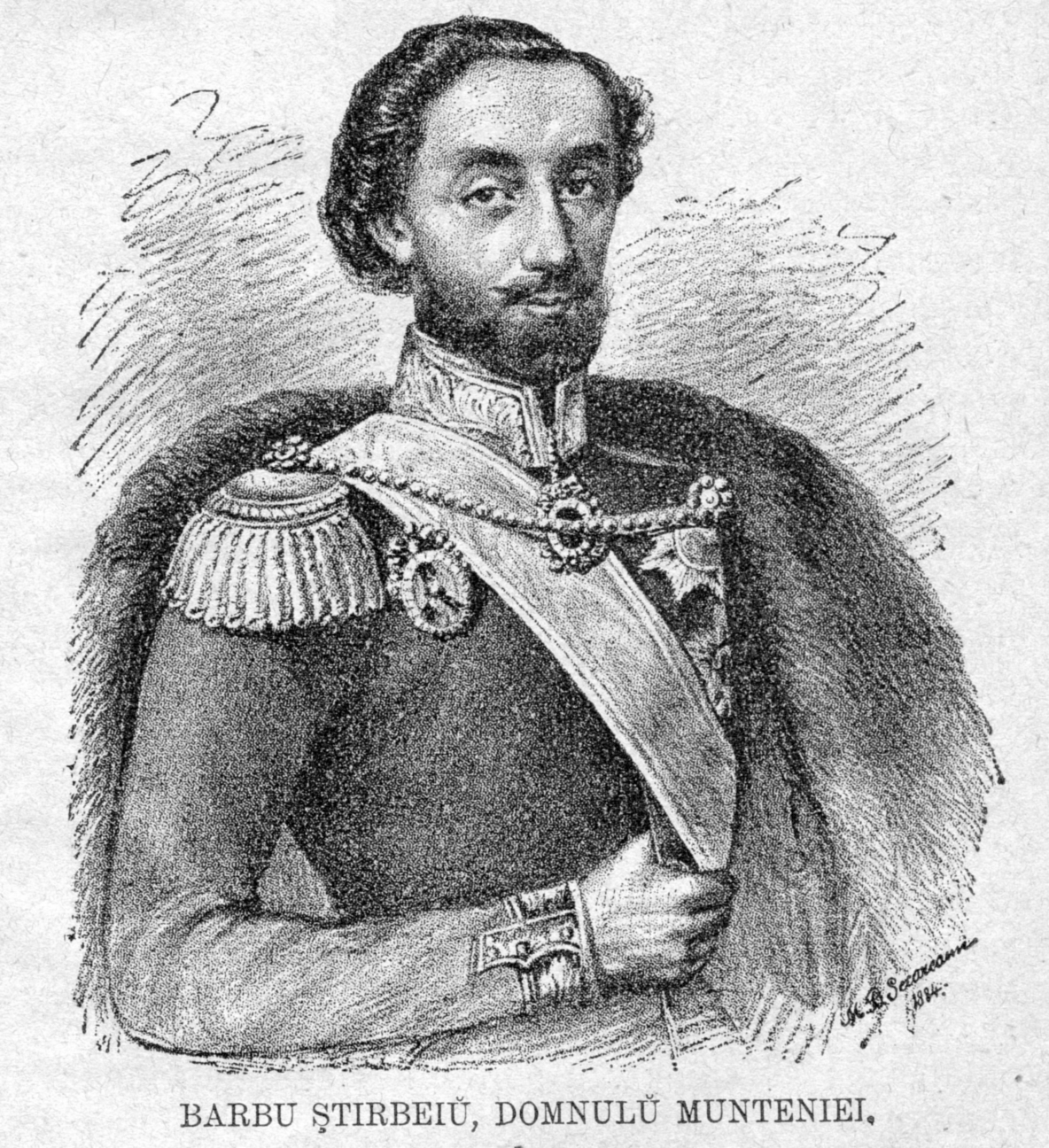
Late 19th century depiction of Barbu Știrbei

Barbu Dimitrie Știrbei ([ˈbarbu diˈmitri.e ʃtirˈbej]), also written as Stirbey, (17 August 1799 – April 13, 1869), a boyar of the Bibescu family, was a hospodar (Prince of Wallachia) on two occasions, between 1848 and 1853, and between 1854 and 1856.

== Early life ==
He was born to Boyar Dumitrache Bibescu, Palatine of Wallachia, and his wife, Ecaterina Văcărescu. He was adopted by his maternal grandfather, the last of the Știrbei family who left him heir to his wealth and family name.

He studied philosophy and law in Paris, at the beginning of Louis XVIII's reign, in 1815. After the return in Wallachia, in 1821 he took refuge from the Wallachian uprising of 1821 in Brașov, Transylvania (part of the Austrian Empire at the time).

== Ascension ==
In 1825, he returned to Bucharest and took on several offices with the administration of Grigore IV Ghica. After Wallachia was occupied by Imperial Russia following the Russo-Turkish War of 1828–1829, general Pavel Kiseleff promoted him to the central government, where he served as president of the Wallachian commission charged with drafting the Organic Regulation, the first form of constitutional law ever implemented in Wallachia.

In 1836, he was given the administration of the Justice Department, where he set up a new commercial code, based on the Napoleonic model, and improved the criminal and civil procedures. After Grigore IV Ghica was removed from the throne, Știrbei was a candidate for the office in the only elections carried under the Regulations' provisions, but renounced his votes in favour of his brother, Gheorghe Bibescu.

== Prince of Wallachia ==
After the 1848 Wallachian Revolutionary Government was overthrown by Ottoman troops, and a new hospodar was to be named, Sultan Abdülmecid I supported Barbu Știrbei for the office, and he was awarded the throne for a seven-year term (under the provisions of the 1849 Convention of Balta-Liman). His reign began under the common occupation of Ottoman Empire and Imperial Russia, occupation which ended in 1851, when Barbu Știrbei was awarded the Order of St. Anna by the Russian Emperor Nicholas I.

During his reign, Știrbei pushed moderate reforms, such as a slight reform of the judiciary system which led to an increase in the number of solved legal disputes. He took steps to enforce a (still very conservative) land reform, by passing a law, in 1851, in which the peasants were referred to as "tenants", and which allowed them to more easily move between boyar properties. In the matter of Roma slavery, Știrbei began by limiting the internal trading in slaves, forbade the separation of families through the latter, and ultimately abolished the institution altogether.

At the beginning of the Crimean War, in 1853, Wallachia was once again occupied by Imperial Russian troops. Barbu Știrbei stayed in Bucharest until the formal declaration of war from the Ottoman Empire, after which he fled to Vienna, only to return the following year, in the autumn of 1854, after the Russian withdrawal, when the country was under Austrian and Ottoman occupation.

In 1856, after the end of the war, at the Treaty of Paris, the question of the unification of Moldavia and Wallachia, the two Danubian Principalities, was debated. Știrbei supported the union, although not very strongly, as he hoped to become prince of the resulting state. However, in early summer, as his term had ended, he stepped back as hospodar and left for Paris.

== Later life ==
In 1857, he was elected deputy in the Ad hoc divan, an assembly charged with giving Wallachia a new constitutional framework. After the divans confirmed the union of the two countries by electing Alexander John Cuza as Domnitor, he returned to Paris together with his brother Gheorghe Bibescu.

He temporarily returned to the country in 1866, in support of the newly elected prince Carol of the Principality of Romania. Barbu Știrbey spent his last years in France, where he died in 1869, in Nice, after visiting Bucharest one last time in 1868.

== Personal life ==
In 1820, he married Princess Elisabeta Cantacuzino, daughter of Prince Grigore Cantacuzino-Pașcanu and his wife, Princess Elena Brâncoveanu, descendant of Constantin Brâncoveanu. They had:

- Princess Fenareta Știrbey (1822–1894); married Prince Theodor Ghica (1820–1865) and had issue
- Princess Elize Știrbey (1827–1890); married Ștefan Bellu (1824–1902) and had issue
- Princess Elena Știrbey (1831–1864); married Count Leo Larisch von Mönnich (1824–1872), and had issue; she was mother-in-law of Marie, only daughter of Duke Ludwig Wilhelm in Bavaria (1831-1920), and had issue
- Prince Alexandru Știrbey (1836–1895); married Princess Maria Ghica-Comănești (1851–1885) and had issue
- Prince Dimitrie Știrbey (1842–1913); married Alexandrine von Soyka (1857–1931) and had issue

== Notes ==
Regnal titles
Preceded by Revolutionary Government	Prince of Wallachia; 1848–1853	Succeeded by Russian occupation
Preceded by Russian occupation	Prince of Wallachia; 1854–1856	Succeeded by Ottoman occupation
