= Pavel Kiselyov =

Russian military officer and reformer (1788–1872)

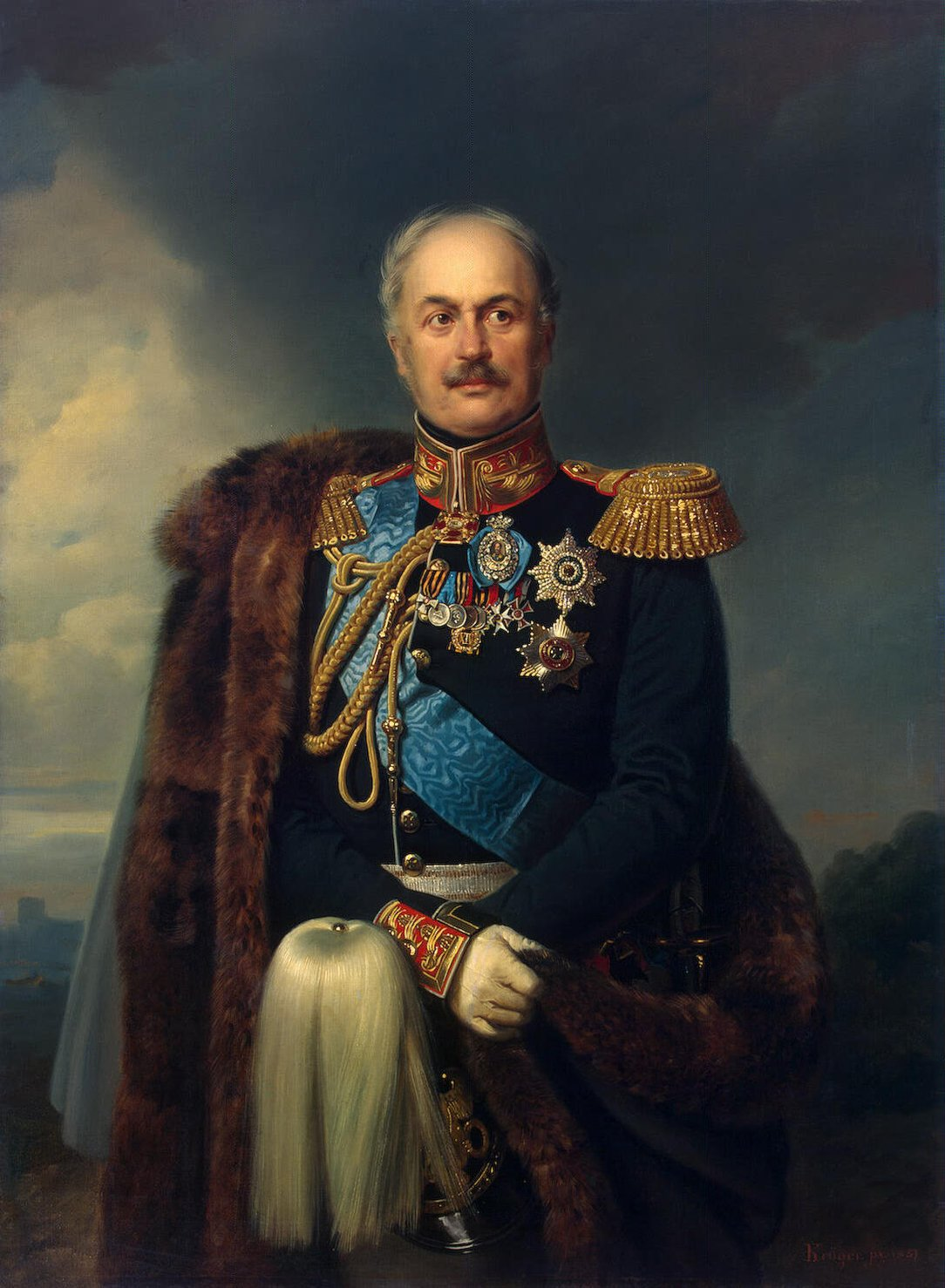
Count Pavel D. Kiselyov (portrait by Franz Krüger, 1851).

Count Pavel Dmitrievich Kiselyov or Kiseleff (Russian: Па́вел Дми́триевич Киселёв; 19 January [O.S. 8 January] 1788, Moscow – 26 November [O.S. 14 November] 1872, Paris) is generally regarded as the most brilliant Russian reformer during Nicholas I's generally conservative reign. Kiselyov was plenipotentiary president (de facto governor) of the Divans (estates of the realm) in Wallachia and Moldavia from 1829 until 1834.

== Early military career ==
Kiselyov first distinguished himself during the Napoleonic Wars, serving as Count Miloradovich's aide-de-camp in the Battle of Borodino, marching with the Russian army all the way to Paris and gaining promotion to Alexander I's aide-de-camp at the close of the campaign.

Five years later, Kiselyov was appointed Chief of Staff of the Second Army, stationed in Tulchyn, Podolia. It was there that he first tried to implement his reforms, including the mitigation and condemnation of corporal punishment, which aroused the animosity of the powerful War Minister, Count Arakcheyev. Pavel Pestel and other Decembrists who formed the southern revolutionary league served under Kiselyov and were supported by him, although the extent to which their collusion was encouraged by Kiselyov's liberalism has been disputed.

== Administration of the Danubian Principalities ==
During the Russo-Turkish War of 1828-1829 Kiselyov was appointed to command the Russian occupying troops in Wallachia and Moldavia, and appointed Plenipotentiary President of the Divans (estates of the realm) in Wallachia and Moldavia (de facto governor) on October 19, 1829 (he was in Zimnicea at the time). He remained the most powerful man in the Danubian Principalities until 1834, when Mahmud II, the Ottoman Sultan, appointed new voivods, Alexandru II Ghica in Wallachia and Mihail Sturdza in Moldavia. The Danubian Principalities would form the modern state of Romania, by uniting in 1859 and declaring their independence from the Ottoman Empire in 1878.

Under his administration, the two states got their first constitutions, the Regulamentul Organic ("Organic Statute", French: Règlement organique, Russian: Oрганический регламент, Organichesky reglament), introduced in Wallachia in 1831 and in Moldavia in 1832, which remained valid until the 1859 union of the principalities, with a short intermission in Wallachia during the 1848 Revolution. The Statute, despite its shortcomings, had a beneficent effect on the economy and politics of the Principalities. He was also responsible for the creation of one of the most important arteries in Bucharest, Șoseaua Kiseleff (Kiseleff Road), a northward continuation of Calea Victoriei (then known as Podul Mogoşoaiei).

== Emancipation projects ==
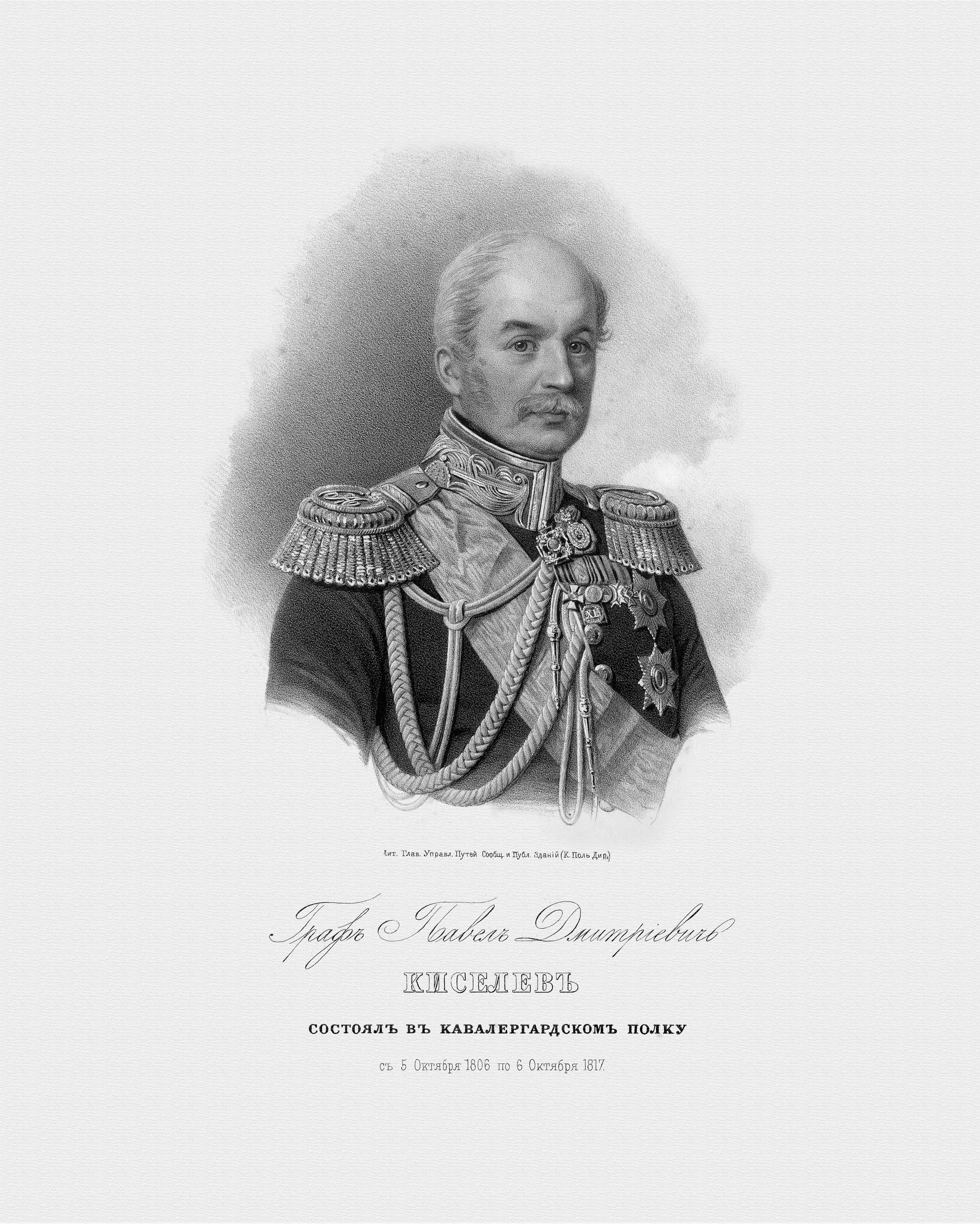
19th century lithograph depicting Count Pavel Dmitrievitch Kiselev as commander of the imperial Chevaliers-Gardes regiment (1806–1817).

Back in Saint Petersburg in 1835, Kiselyov was admitted to the State Council of Imperial Russia and to the secret committees deliberating on effective ways to emancipate the serfs. The same year, Kiselyov submitted to the tsar a comprehensive programme for reforms, which scared conservative landowners so much that the monarch had it laid to rest. It is believed that the programme was based on Kiselyov's own memorandum, which he had first prepared as early as 1816.

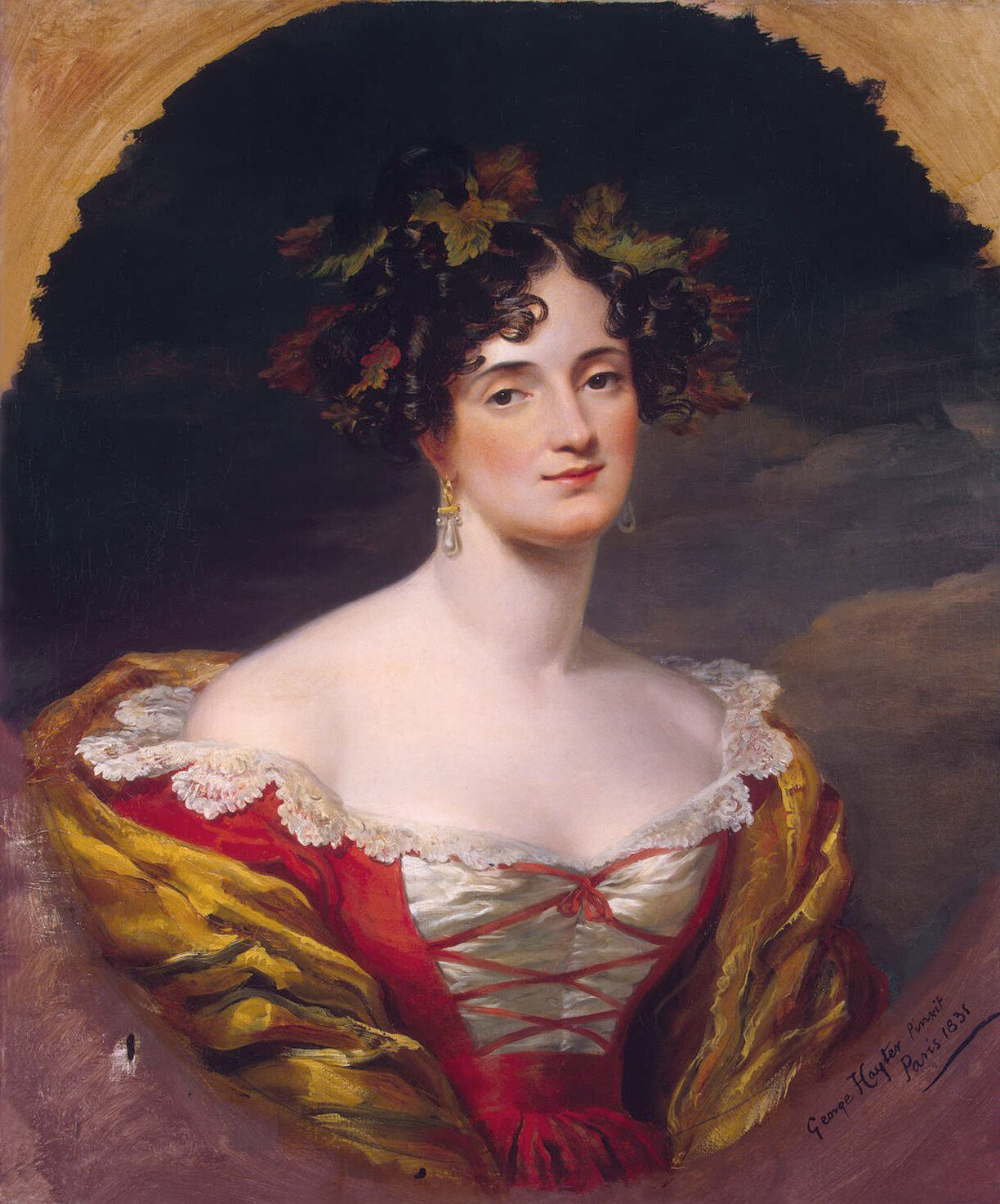
Sofia Kisielew by Sir George Hayter in Paris, 1831 (Hermitage Museum)

Two years later, Kiselyov was appointed Imperial Minister of State Properties, a key post which he filled with great efficiency for 18 years. In 1839, Kiselyov became a count and reformed the administration of state-owned peasants. He also instituted a system of schools for peasant children, popularly known as the Kiselyov Schools. The minister could not persevere with other reform plans, as the ascendancy of reactionary forces lasted until Nicholas's death in 1855. Nicholas's successor, Alexander II, dispatched Kiselyov to Paris in the capacity of Minister Plenipotentiary to deal with the effects of the Crimean War.

Kiselyov was married to Countess Sofia, Stanisław Szczęsny Potocki's daughter, but their only son died in infancy. As a result, the old courtier spent much time with his nephews and heirs from the Milyutin family. Although he hoped to see Nicholas Milyutin presiding over the emancipation reform that followed, his aspirations in this regard were only partially rewarded. His other nephew, Dmitry Milyutin, was responsible for the sweeping reforms of the Russian military in the 1870s. Kiselyov remained in the diplomatic service until 1862, when failing health compelled him to lay down his offices. He never returned to Russia and died in Paris ten years later.

== See also ==
- Kiseleff Cup
