= Florei =

Florei Șteiasa
- Location within Romania

Location
- Country: Romania
- Counties: Prahova County

Physical characteristics
- Source: Baiu Mountains
- Mouth: Doftana
  - location: Teșila
  - coordinates: 45.2985°N 25.7236°E
- Length: 15 km (9.3 mi)
- Basin size: 43 km^{2} (17 sq mi)

Basin features
- Progression: Doftana→ Prahova→ Ialomița→ Danube→ Black Sea
- Tributaries
  - right: Drăgan, Coțofana, Vornicu, Valea Mierlelor, Zănoaga

The Florei is a right tributary of the river Doftana in Romania. The upper reach of the river is also known as Șteiasa. It flows into the Doftana in Teșila. Its length is 15 km (9.3 mi) and its basin size is 43 km^{2} (17 sq mi).
