= Limbășel =

- Location within Romania

Location
- Country: Romania
- Counties: Prahova County

Physical characteristics
- Source: Baiu Mountains
- Mouth: Azuga
  - coordinates: 45°26′55″N 25°36′05″E
  - elevation: 1,008 m (3,307 ft)
- Length: 8 km (5.0 mi)
- Basin size: 14 km^{2} (5.4 sq mi)

Basin features
- Progression: Azuga→ Prahova→ Ialomița→ Danube→ Black Sea
- Tributaries
  - left: Cenușeroaia
  - right: Limbășelu Mic

The Limbășel is a right tributary of the river Azuga in Romania. Its source is in the Baiu Mountains, near Predeal. It flows into the Azuga east of the town Azuga. Its length is 8 km (5.0 mi) and its basin size is 14 km^{2} (5.4 sq mi).
