= Breaza =

- Town
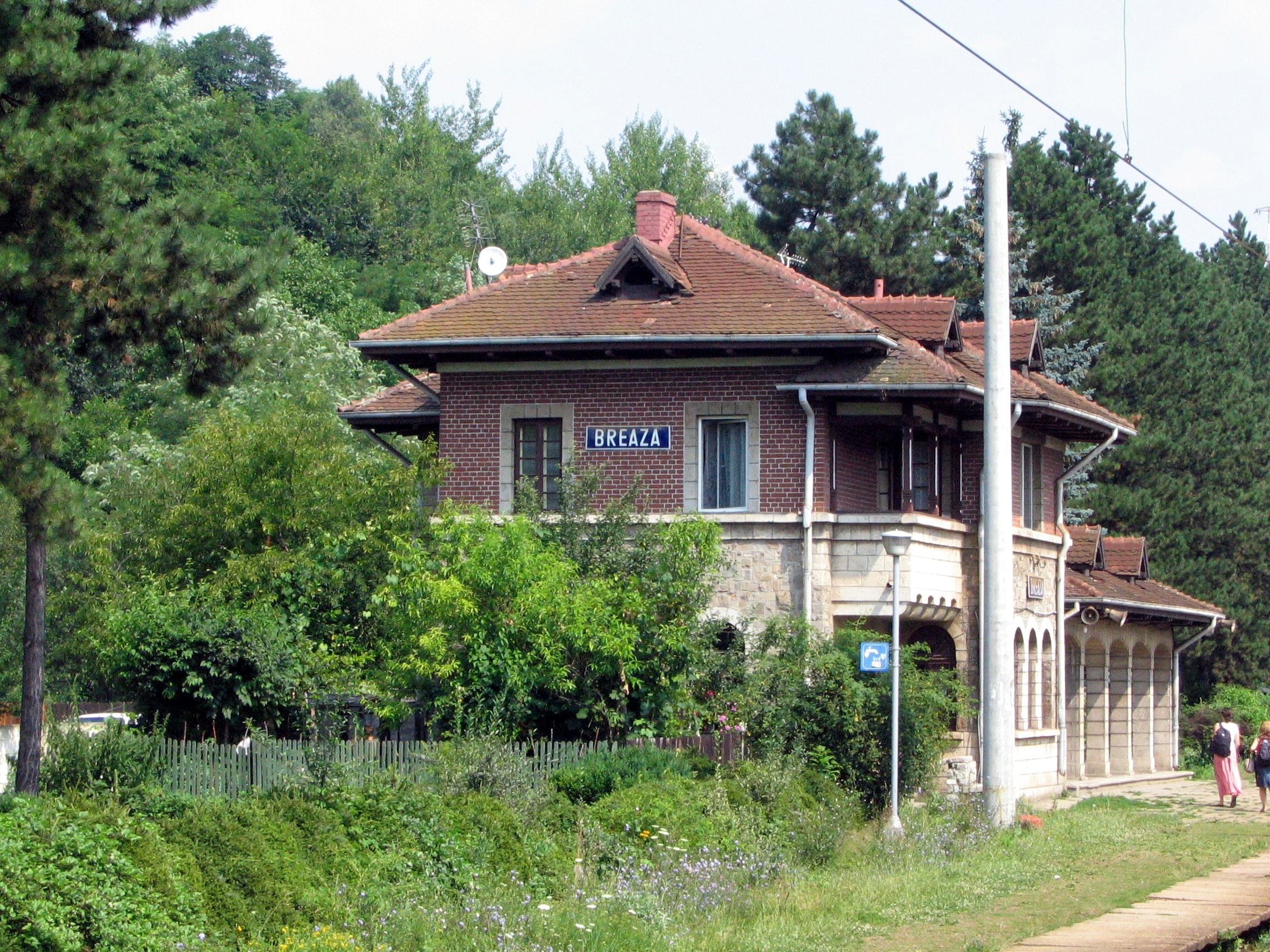
- Breaza railway station

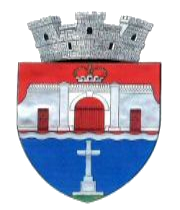
- Coat of arms

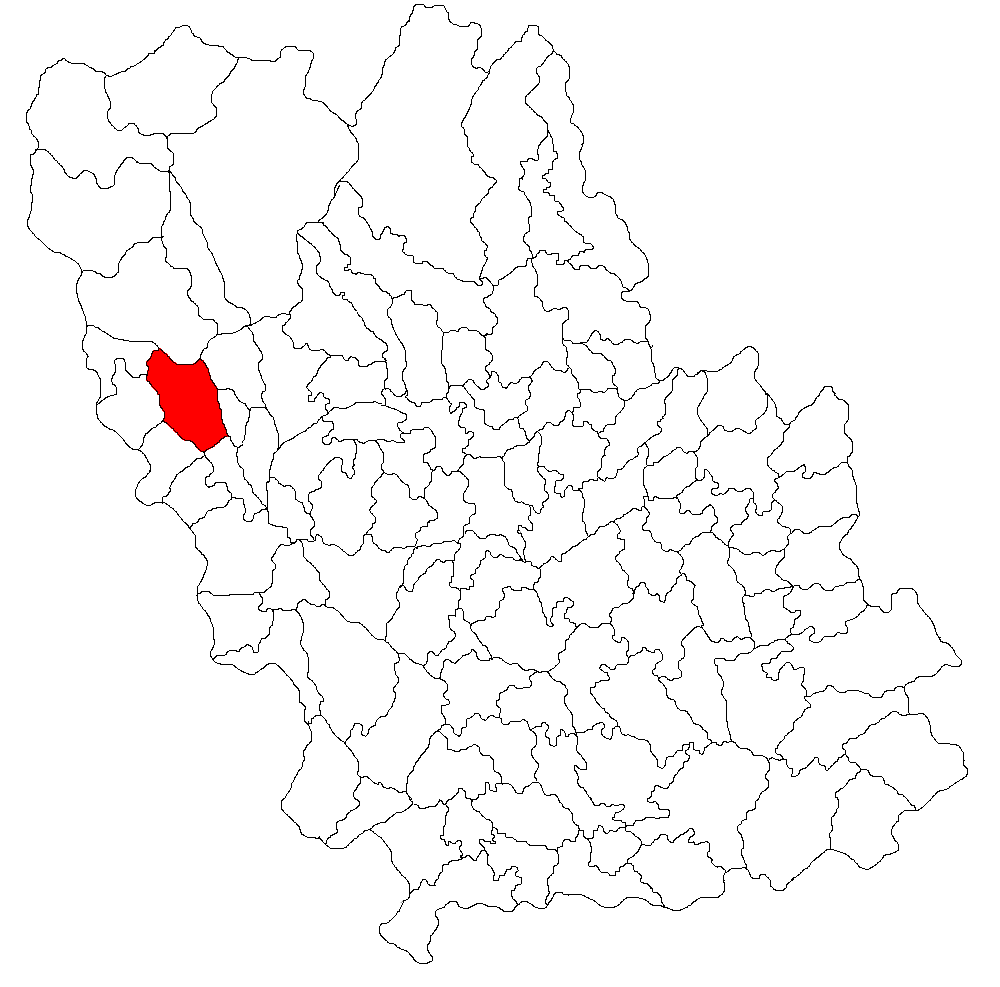
- Location in Prahova County

- Location in Romania
- Coordinates: 45°11′14″N 25°39′44″E
- Country: Romania
- County: Prahova

Government
  - Mayor (2024–2028): Bogdan Cristian Novac (PNL)
- Area: 50.69 km^{2} (19.57 sq mi)
- Elevation: 450 m (1,480 ft)
- Highest elevation: 600 m (2,000 ft)
- Lowest elevation: 380 m (1,250 ft)
- Population (2021-12-01): 14,871
  - Density: 293.4/km^{2} (759.8/sq mi)
- Time zone: UTC+02:00 (EET)
  - Summer (DST): UTC+03:00 (EEST)
- Postal code: 105400
- Area code: (+40) 02 44
- Vehicle reg.: PH
- Website: primariabreaza.ro

Breaza (Romanian pronunciation: [ˈbre̯aza]) is a town in Prahova County, Muntenia, Romania. The town center consists of at least two former villages, Podu Vadului and Breaza de Sus, which were later merged. Today, ten villages are administratively part of the town: Breaza de Jos, Breaza de Sus, Frăsinet, Gura Beliei, Irimești, Nistorești, Podu Corbului, Podu Vadului, Surdești, and Valea Târsei.

== Geography ==
The town is situated in the foothills of the Baiu and Bucegi mountains, at an altitude of about 450 m (1,480 ft). It lies on the banks of the river Prahova, towards the southern end of the Prahova Valley. Breaza is located in the northwestern part of the county, 42 km (26 mi) from the county seat, Ploiești.

== History ==
Historical population
Year	Pop.	±%
1956	11,122	—
1966	12,733	+14.5%
1977	17,583	+38.1%
1992	19,329	+9.9%
2002	18,863	−2.4%
2011	15,928	−15.6%
2021	14,871	−6.6%
Source: Census data

The town's name is derived from a Slavic word, breza, meaning "birch tree".

The town was first documented in an act of 1503, mentioning a certain trader of Breaza called "Neagoe". In 1622 the land of Breaza was divided between four boyars and in 1717, the new ruler of Wallachia, Nicolae Mavrocordat gave the Breaza estate to boyar Iordache Crețulescu. The land was divided by the agrarian reform of 1921 and in 1935 it was declared a spa.

== Economy ==
One of the main occupations is farming, and traditional needlework, but many inhabitants also commute to work in the neighboring towns of Comarnic and Câmpina. Tourism is also important for the local economy, and many locals rent out rooms in the summer months.

Due to its naturally beautiful surroundings, being located among rolling hills, the town has long been popular with inhabitants of Bucharest, who tend to have vacation homes here. Among the people who had second residences in Breaza were Adrian Păunescu.

It is also the site of a folk art museum and a military high school.

== Natives ==
- Ion Cavași (born 1953), alpine skier
- Constantin Dăscălescu (1923–2003), communist politician who served as Prime Minister from 1982 to 1989
- Rareș Dogaru (born 2003), footballer
- Florian Enache (born 1971), bobsledder
- Dumitru Focșeneanu (1935–2019), bobsledder
- Gheorghe Ionescu-Sinaia (1888–1969), general
- Nicolae Pescaru (1943–2019), football player and manager
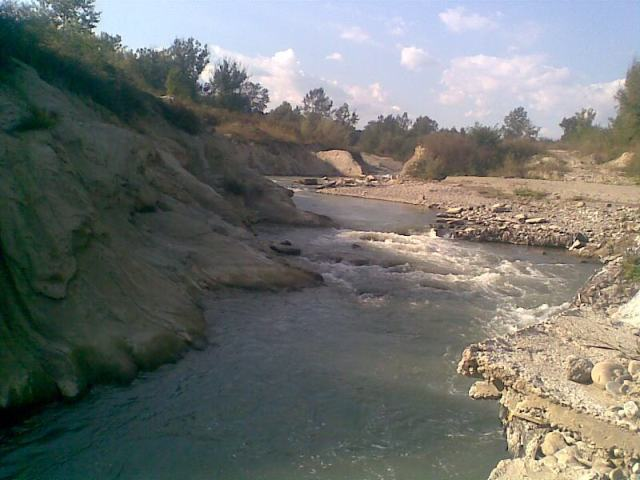
Prahova River at Breaza

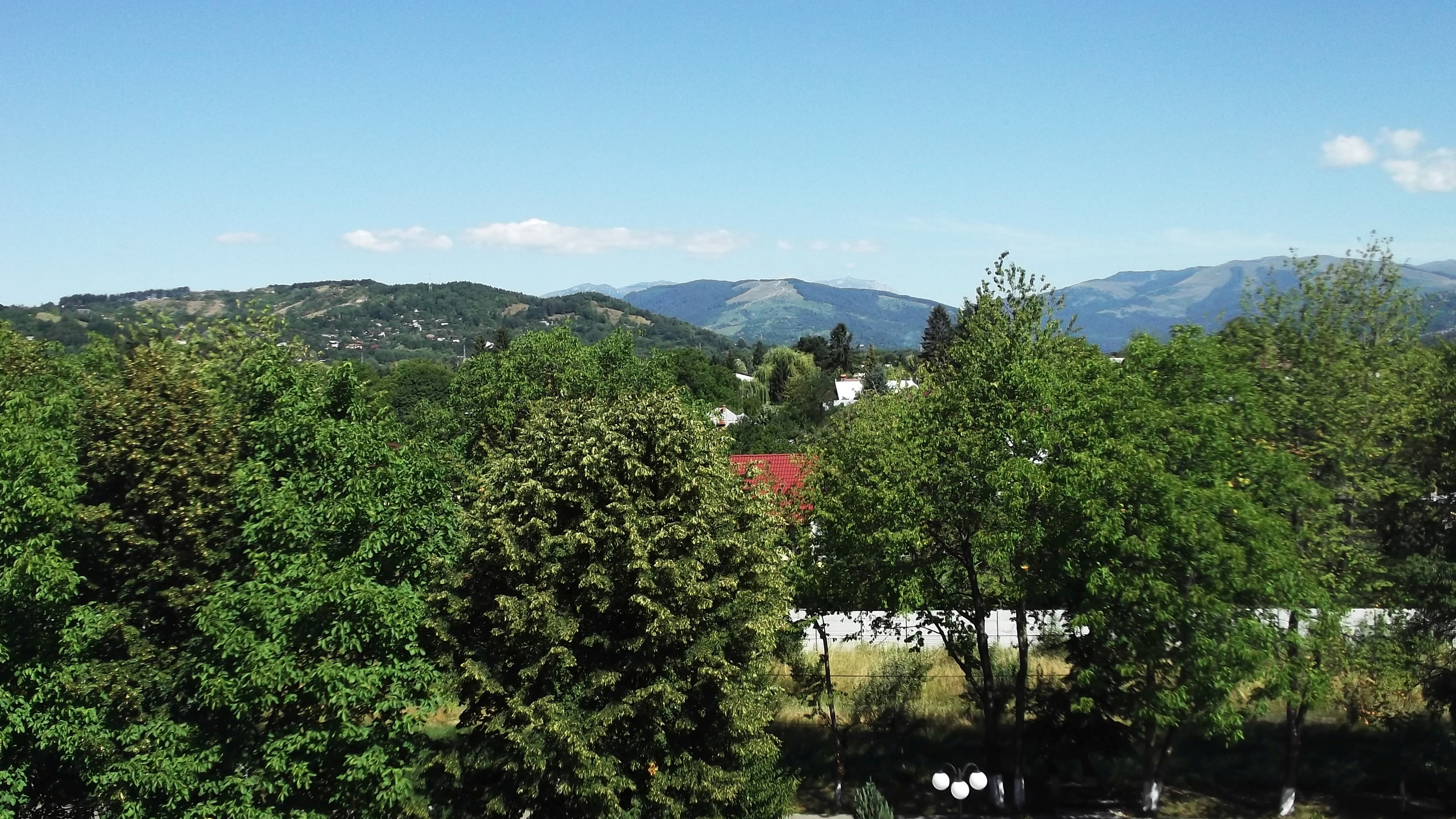
View towards the Baiu Mountains (Lazu Hill, Mount Gurguiatu, and Mount Gârbova)

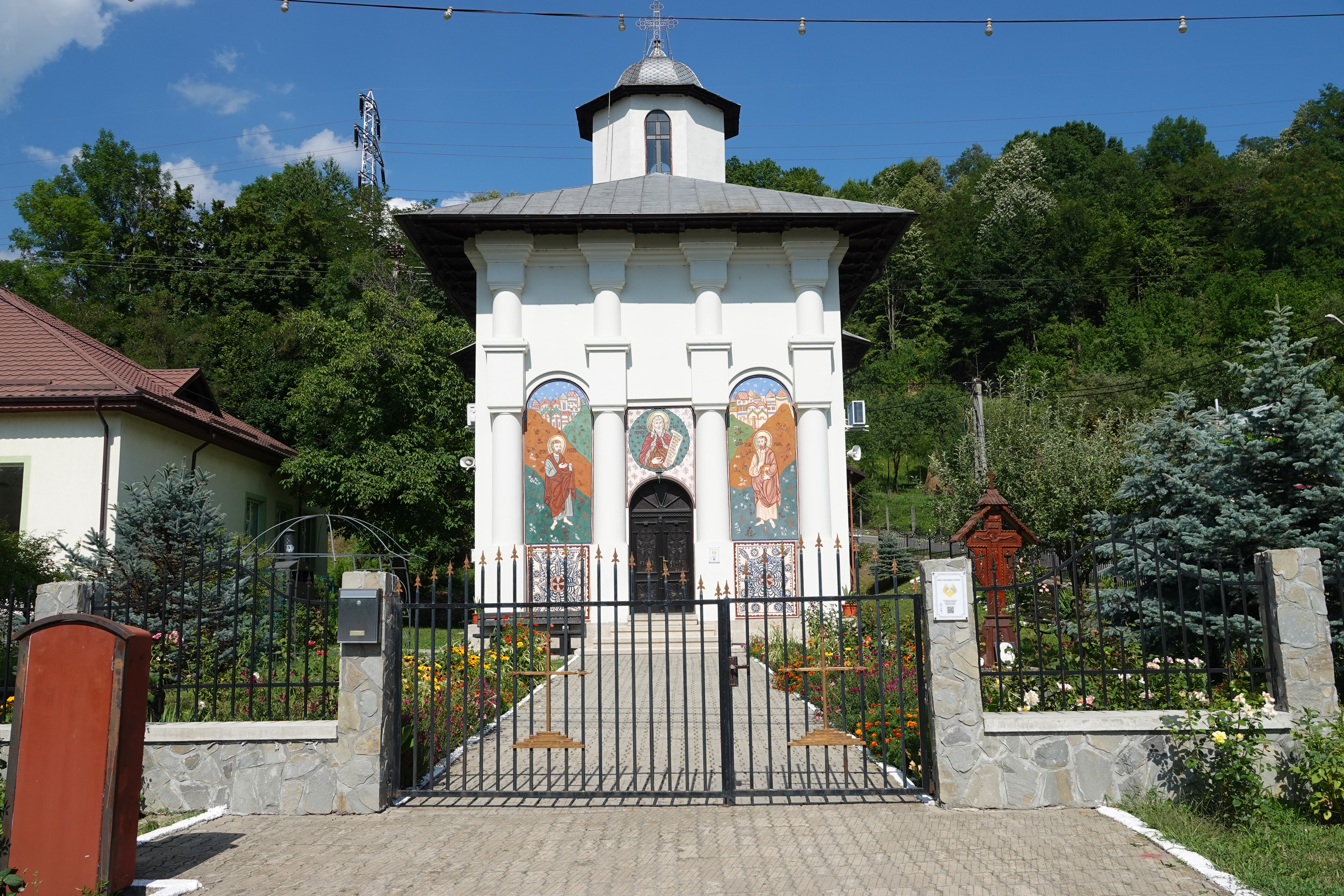
St. Elijah the Prophet church in Nistorești

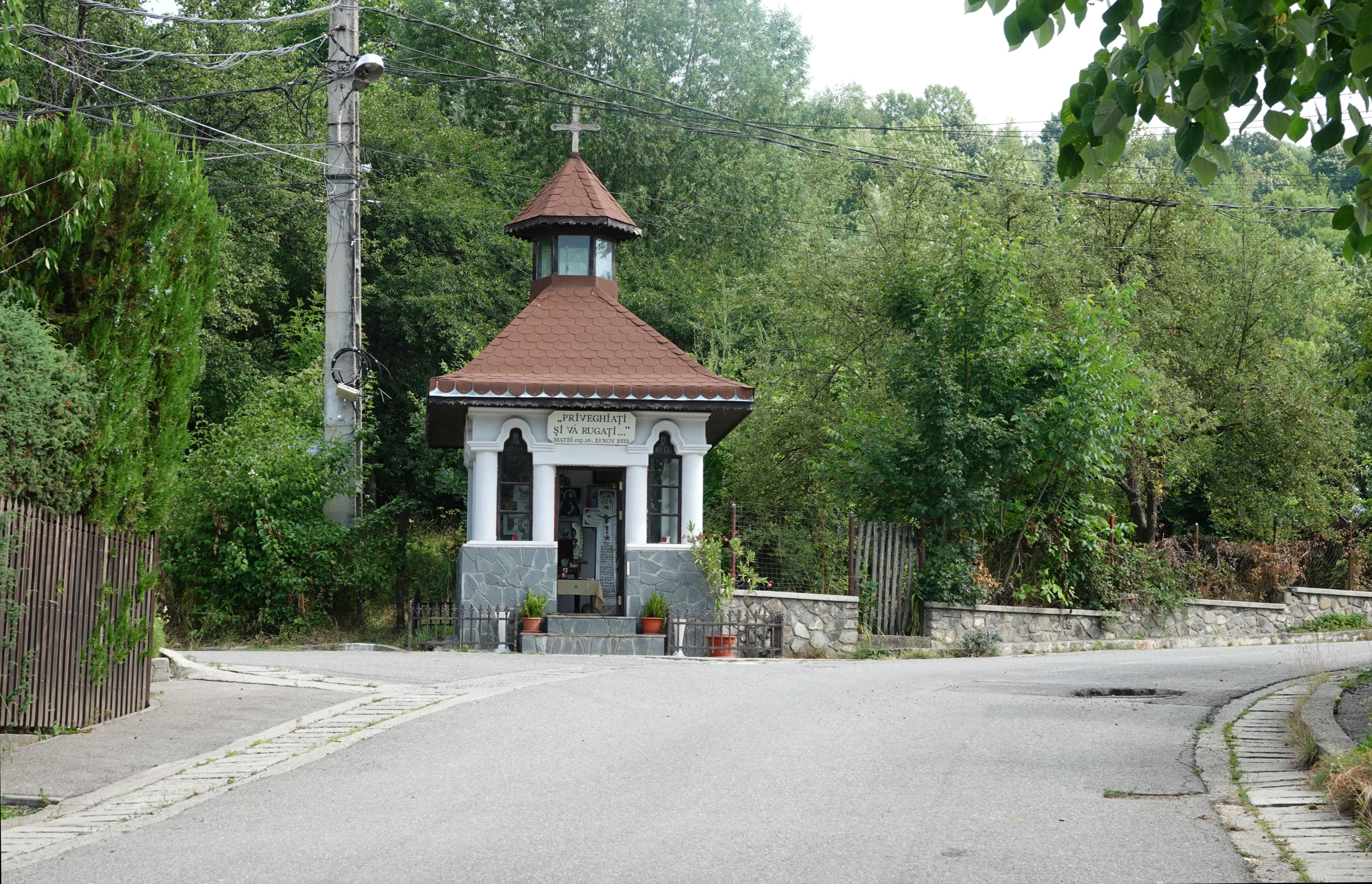
Wayside cross in Frăsinet

== Climate ==
Breaza has a humid continental climate (Cfb in the Köppen climate classification).

Climate data for Breaza
Month	Jan	Feb	Mar	Apr	May	Jun	Jul	Aug	Sep	Oct	Nov	Dec	Year
Mean daily maximum °C (°F)	2 (36)	3.9 (39.0)	8.6 (47.5)	14.1 (57.4)	18.9 (66.0)	22.4 (72.3)	24.5 (76.1)	24.6 (76.3)	19.6 (67.3)	13.8 (56.8)	8.5 (47.3)	3.7 (38.7)	13.7 (56.7)
Daily mean °C (°F)	−2.4 (27.7)	−0.6 (30.9)	3.6 (38.5)	9.3 (48.7)	14.4 (57.9)	18.1 (64.6)	20.1 (68.2)	20 (68)	15.1 (59.2)	9.4 (48.9)	4.5 (40.1)	−0.5 (31.1)	9.3 (48.7)
Mean daily minimum °C (°F)	−6 (21)	−4.7 (23.5)	−1.2 (29.8)	4.1 (39.4)	9.1 (48.4)	13 (55)	15.1 (59.2)	15.1 (59.2)	10.7 (51.3)	5.4 (41.7)	1.3 (34.3)	−3.6 (25.5)	4.9 (40.7)
Average precipitation mm (inches)	46 (1.8)	46 (1.8)	63 (2.5)	96 (3.8)	147 (5.8)	159 (6.3)	154 (6.1)	118 (4.6)	77 (3.0)	66 (2.6)	57 (2.2)	55 (2.2)	1,084 (42.7)
Source: https://en.climate-data.org/europe/romania/prahova/breaza-15254/
