= Clăbucetul Taurului =

Mountain in Romania

Coordinates: 45°27′44″N 25°35′20″E

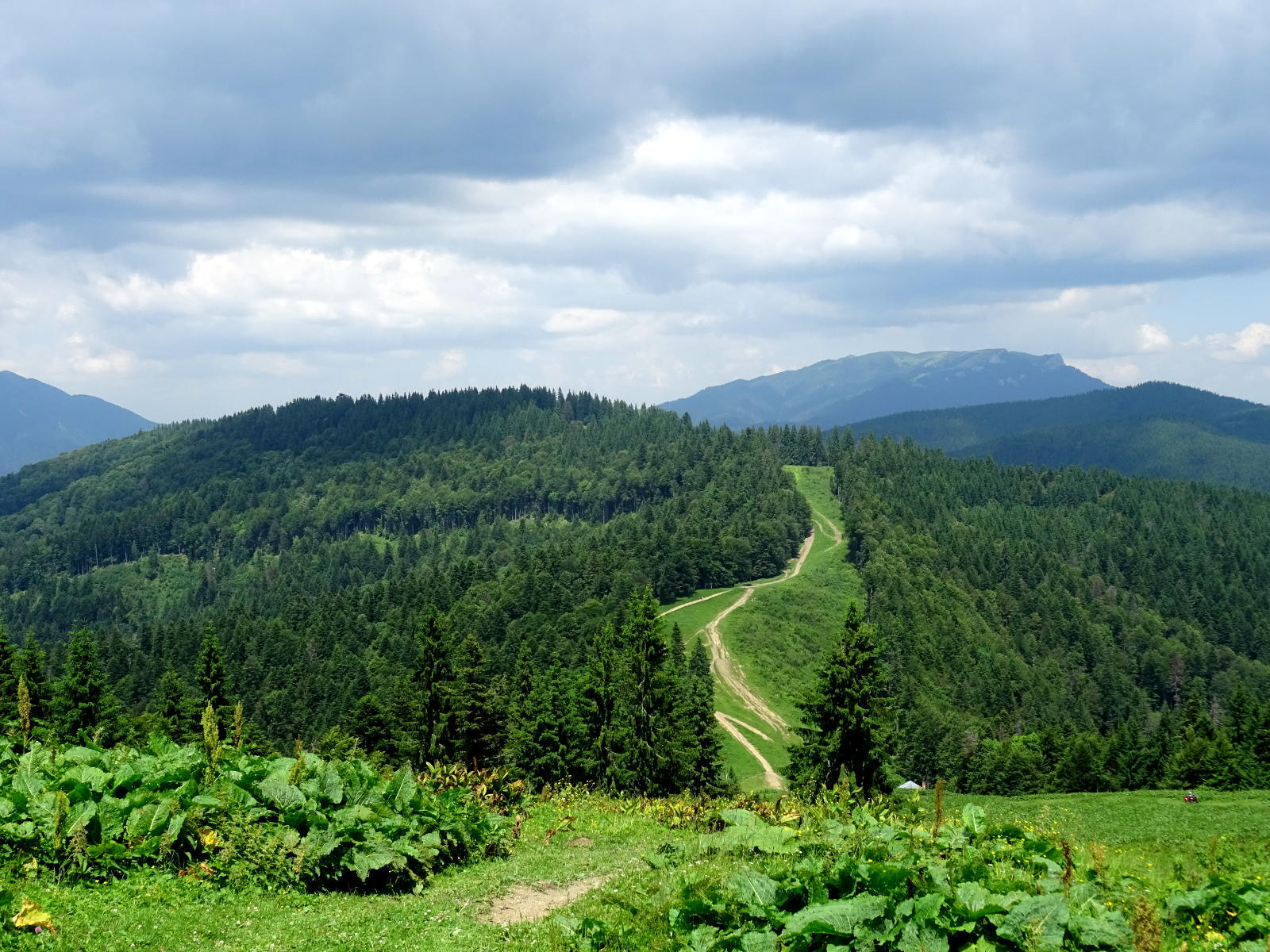

Geography

Clăbucetul Taurului ("the bull's cap") is a mountain in Romania, part of Baiu Mountains in the Southern Carpathians. The highest peak is 1,520 m (4,987 ft) high.

Located on the border of Brașov and Prahova counties, it is in the vicinity of Predeal, and features rich pastures. In 1844, the mountain was purchased by Alecu Filipescu-Vulpea. Pursuant to a deed issued by Prince Gheorghe Bibescu Filipescu granted it to Predeal Monastery later that year. It remained with the monastery until the 1863 secularization of monastic estates in Romania. Near the end of the 19th century, it passed to the crown domains, established in 1884.
