= Negraș =

- Location within Romania

Location
- Country: Romania
- Counties: Prahova County

Physical characteristics
- Source: Grohotiș Mountains
- Mouth: Doftana
  - location: Trăisteni
  - coordinates: 45.3282°N 25.7240°E
- Length: 11 km (6.8 mi)
- Basin size: 47 km^{2} (18 sq mi)

Basin features
- Progression: Doftana→ Prahova→ Ialomița→ Danube→ Black Sea
- Tributaries
  - left: Cărăbăneasa, Cucioaia, Valea Urșilor

The Negraș is a left tributary of the river Doftana in Romania. It discharges into the Doftana in Trăisteni. Its length is 11 km (6.8 mi) and its basin size is 47 km^{2} (18 sq mi).
