= Prislop (river) =

- Location within Romania

Location
- Country: Romania
- Counties: Prahova County

Physical characteristics
- Source: Baiu Mountains
- Mouth: Doftana
  - coordinates: 45.3282°N 25.7234°E
- Length: 15 km (9.3 mi)
- Basin size: 39 km^{2} (15 sq mi)

Basin features
- Progression: Doftana→ Prahova→ Ialomița→ Danube→ Black Sea
- Tributaries
  - left: Valea lui Petru
  - right: Băiuț, Baiu Mare, Porcăreața

The Prislop is a right tributary of the river Doftana in Romania. It discharges into the Doftana in Trăisteni. Its length is 15 km (9.3 mi) and its basin size is 39 km^{2} (15 sq mi).
