= Păltinoasa River =

Păltinoasa River may refer to:

- Păltinoasa, a tributary of the Lotru in Vâlcea County
- Păltinoasa, a tributary of the Doftana in Prahova County
