= Doftana (Prahova) =

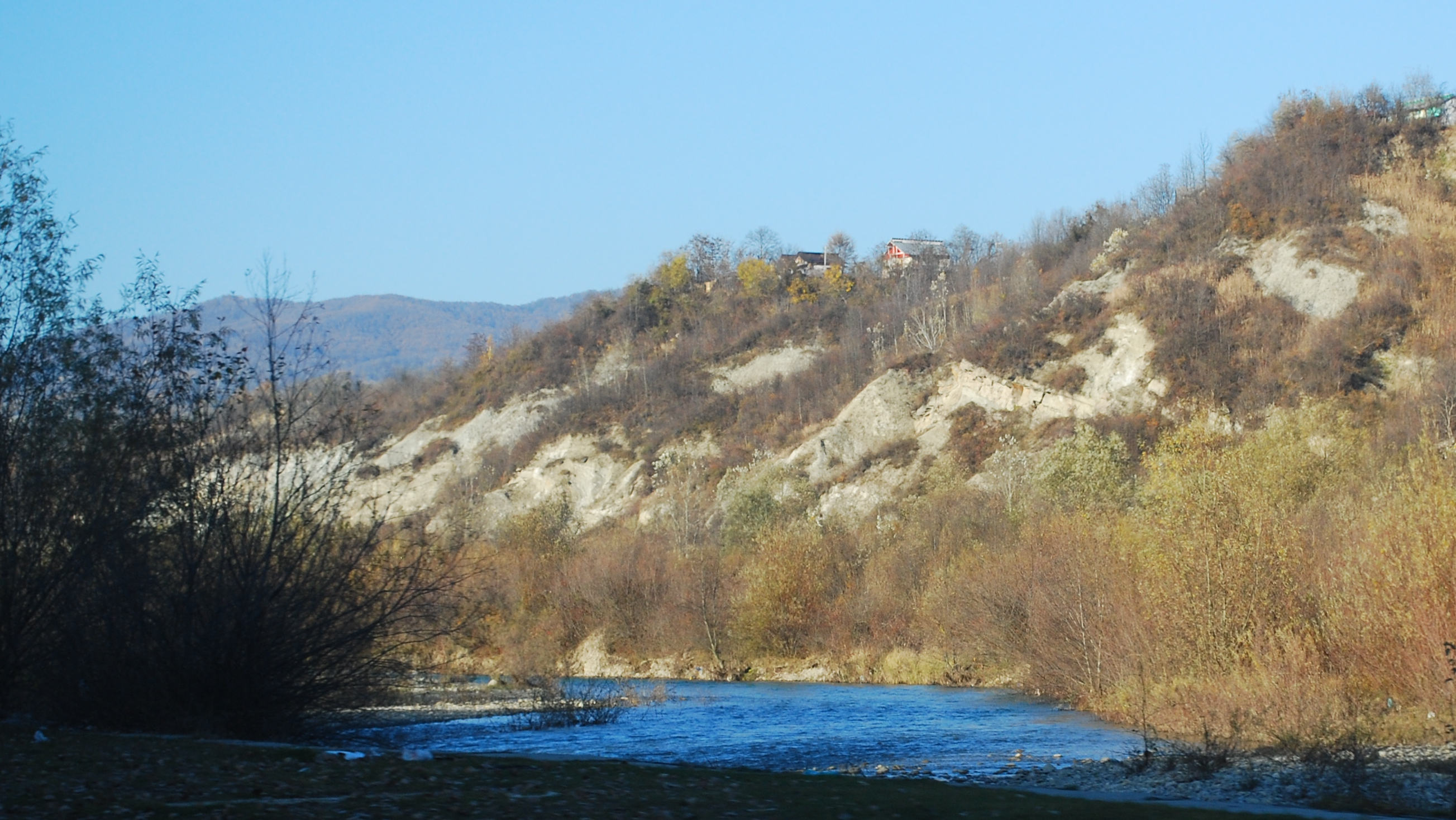

- Location within Romania

Location
- Country: Romania
- Counties: Prahova County

Physical characteristics
- Source: Baiu Mountains, Predeluș Pass
- Mouth: Prahova
  - location: Downstream of Câmpina
  - coordinates: 45.0996°N 25.7499°E
- Length: 51 km (32 mi)
- Basin size: 410 km^{2} (160 sq mi)

Basin features
- Progression: Prahova→ Ialomița→ Danube→ Black Sea

The Doftana is a left tributary of the river Prahova in Romania. It discharges into the Prahova in Bănești near Câmpina. It flows through the villages Trăisteni, Teșila, Seciuri, Brebu Mânăstirei, Doftana and the city Câmpina. Its length is 51 km (32 mi) and its basin size is 410 km^{2} (160 sq mi). The upper reach of the river, upstream of the confluence with the Urlățelu is also called Predeluș or Doftănița.

== Tributaries ==
The following rivers are tributaries to the river Doftana (from source to mouth):

- Left: Urlățelu, Neagra, Negraș, Mogoșoaia, Erniereasa, Vâlceaua Vlădișor, Păltinoasa, Valea Grecilor, Valea Rea, Purcaru
- Right: Mușița, Glodeasa, Orjogoaia, Valea Seacă, Prislop, Florei, Secăria
