= Purcaru =

- Location within Romania

Location
- Country: Romania
- Counties: Prahova County
- Villages: Pietriceaua, Brebu Mânăstirei, Brebu Megieșesc, Doftana

Physical characteristics
- Source: Grohotiș Mountains
- Mouth: Doftana
  - coordinates: 45.1462°N 25.7697°E
- Length: 10 km (6.2 mi)
- Basin size: 29 km^{2} (11 sq mi)

Basin features
- Progression: Doftana→ Prahova→ Ialomița→ Danube→ Black Sea

The Purcaru is a left tributary of the river Doftana in Romania. It flows into the Doftana in the village Doftana. Its length is 10 km (6.2 mi) and its basin size is 29 km^{2} (11 sq mi).
