= Alexandru Vagner =

Romanian footballer (1989–2022)

- Vagner in 2017 with Petrolul Ploiești

Personal information
- Full name: Alexandru Ion Vagner
- Date of birth: 19 August 1989
- Place of birth: Azuga, Romania
- Date of death: 30 September 2022 (aged 33)
- Place of death: Brașov, Romania
- Position: Midfielder

Senior career*
Years	Team	Apps	(Gls)
2006–2010	Gloria Bistriţa	27	(0)
2006–2007	→ Baia Mare (loan)	16	(0)
2007–2008	→ Forex Brașov (loan)	28	(1)
2010	→ Târgu Mureș (loan)	10	(2)
2010–2013	Târgu Mureș	53	(1)
2013–2014	Brașov	44	(0)
2015–2017	Concordia Chiajna	17	(0)
2016–2017	→ Brașov (loan)	16	(0)
2017	Petrolul Ploiești	0	(0)
2017–2018	SR Brașov	8	(3)
2021	SR Brașov	1	(0)
2022	Inter Cristian	0	(0)
Total		220	(7)
- * Club domestic league appearances and goals

Alexandru Ion Vagner (19 August 1989 – 30 September 2022) was a Romanian footballer who played as a midfielder. He spent his entire career playing in Romania, having a total of 120 Liga I appearances with one goal scored and 62 Liga II appearances with two goals scored.

Vagner suffered a heart attack during a training session with Inter Cristian. Emergency services subsequently transported him to Brașov County Emergency Hospital, but nothing could be done to save his life; he died at the age of 33.

== See also ==
- List of association footballers who died while playing
