= Azuga (river) =

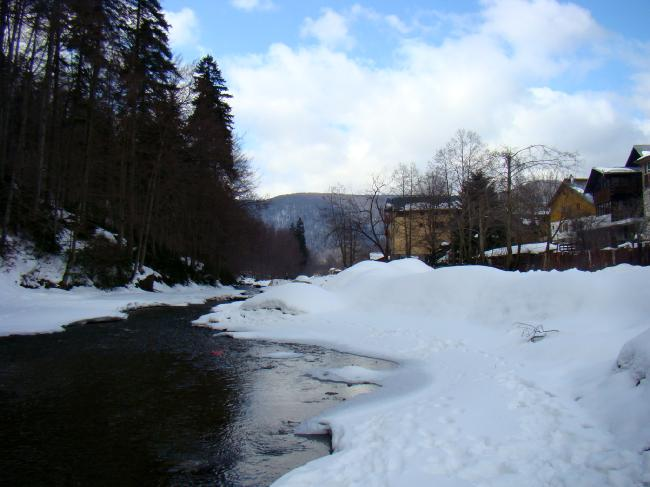
- The Azuga upstream of the town of Azuga

- Location within Romania

Location
- Country: Romania
- Counties: Brașov, Prahova

Physical characteristics
- Source: Baiu Mountains
  - coordinates: 45°29′49″N 25°41′32″E
- Mouth: Prahova
  - location: Azuga
  - coordinates: 45°26′30″N 25°33′03″E
  - elevation: 926 m (3,038 ft)
- Length: 23 km (14 mi)
- Basin size: 88 km^{2} (34 sq mi)

Basin features
- Progression: Prahova→ Ialomița→ Danube→ Black Sea

The Azuga is a left tributary of the river Prahova in Romania. It discharges into the Prahova in the town Azuga. Its length is 23 km (14 mi) and its basin size is 88 km^{2} (34 sq mi).

== Tributaries ==
The following rivers are tributaries to the river Azuga (from source to mouth):

- Left: Pârâul Roșu, Retevoi, Valea Lacului Roșu, Valea Turcului, Ștevia, Valea Roșie, Unghia Mică, Unghia Mare, Ceaușoaia, Cazacu, Urechea, Sita
- Right: Limbășel, Glodu, Valea Pichetului, Cășăria
