= Rareș Dogaru =

Romanian professional footballer

Personal information
- Full name: Rareș Ștefan Dogaru
- Date of birth: 11 December 2003 (age 22)
- Place of birth: Breaza, Romania
- Position: Forward

Youth career
- 2013–2016: Viitorul Fortuna Breaza
- 2016–2018: Tricolorul Breaza

Senior career*
| Years | Team | Apps | (Gls) |
| 2018–2019 | Tricolorul Breaza | 8 | (2) |
| 2019–2020 | Blejoi | 12 | (1) |
| 2020–2022 | Gaz Metan Mediaș | 6 | (0) |
- * Club domestic league appearances and goals as of 13:59, 14 June 2021 (UTC)

Rareș Ștefan Dogaru (born 11 December 2003) is a Romanian professional footballer who plays as a forward.

== Career statistics ==
=== Club ===
| Club | Season | Division | League | | Cup | | Total | |
| Club | Season | Division | Apps | Goals | Apps | Goals | Apps | Goals |
|---|---|---|---|---|---|---|---|---|
| Tricolorul Breaza | 2018–19 | Liga IV | 8 | 2 | 0 | 0 | 8 | 2 |
| CS Blejoi | 2019–20 | Liga III | 15 | 1 | 0 | 0 | 15 | 1 |
| Gaz Metan Mediaș | 2019–20 | Liga I | 4 | 0 | 0 | 0 | 4 | 0 |
| Gaz Metan Mediaș | 2020–21 | Liga I | 2 | 0 | 0 | 0 | 2 | 0 |
| Gaz Metan Mediaș | Total | | 6 | 0 | 0 | 0 | 6 | 0 |
| Career Total | | | 29 | 3 | 0 | 0 | 29 | 3 |
