= Mavrogheni Church =

Heritage site in Bucharest, Romania

Coordinates: 44°27′19″N 26°05′00″E

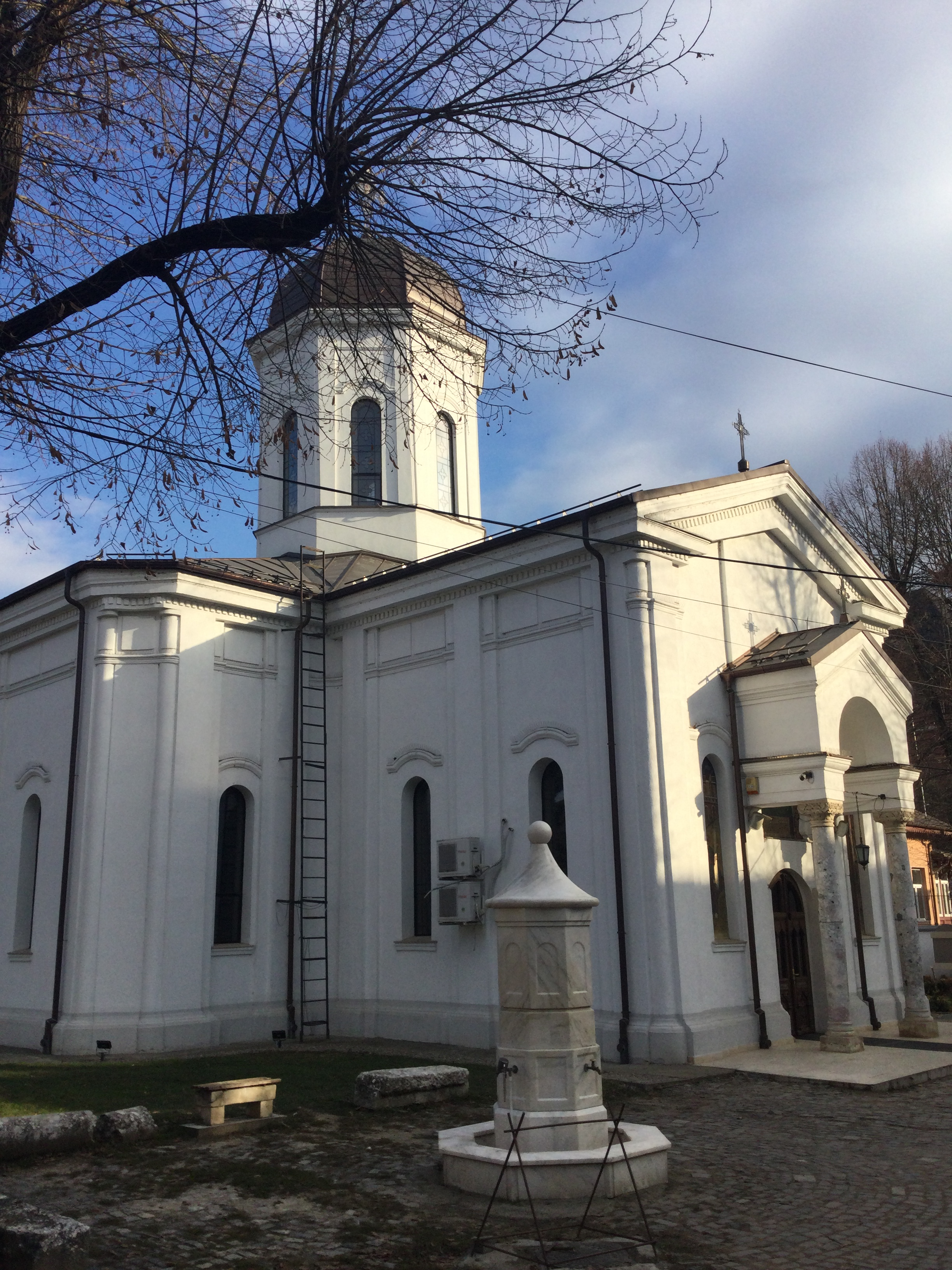
Mavrogheni Church

The Mavrogheni Church (Romanian: Biserica Mavrogheni) is a Romanian Orthodox church located at 4 Monetăriei Street in Bucharest, Romania, north of Victory Square. It is dedicated to the Life-giving Spring.

The church was built in 1786-1787 by Nicholas Mavrogenes, the Prince of Wallachia, and his wife Maria, in thanks for their daughter’s recovery from an incurable disease. It was initially a monastery attached to Panagia Ekatontapiliani on his native Paros, and the ktetor endowed it with land, stores and mills. It became a parish church after the 1863 secularization of monastic estates.

The church was already deteriorated in 1794, when Prince Alexander Mourouzis ordered repairs. After the 1838 earthquake, it was repaired in 1847: the dome above the narthex was removed, and a portico was added, the latter being replaced in 1947. According to the new pisanie, massive repairs took place in 1890 and again in 1902. Further interventions were undertaken in 1941, following the 1940 quake, which destroyed the bell tower near the street; and in 1945, following the 1944 aerial bombardments. In 1971-1973, the interior was repainted after the 1927 frescoes had deteriorated. The 1977 earthquake affected the structure.

The cross-shaped church has ample apses: these are rectangular on the exterior, semicircular on the interior, while the altar apse is elongated. The octagonal dome sits above the nave, while the narthex ceiling is curved on three sides. The small portico features an arch resting on two columns with capitals decorated florally. The facades are simple, with a cornice in profile and a sawtooth decoration. The large windows end in semicircles. An unusual element of the interior painting is a depiction of the zodiac in the choir area. The iconostasis was restored in 1977; it is a wall 80 centimeters thick, painted with five levels of icons in Baroque style. The oriental influences and stucco relief decorations of plants and animals are typical of the 18th century.

The church is listed as a historic monument by Romania's Ministry of Culture and Religious Affairs. Also listed is the tomb of Ion Heliade Rădulescu. The yard holds several other graves, belonging to Princess Zoe Bagration (Văcărescu), the Filipescu family, Prince Mihail Suțu and his wife. In 1997, a new bell tower was built in Neo-Brâncovenesc style.
