= Azuga =

- Town
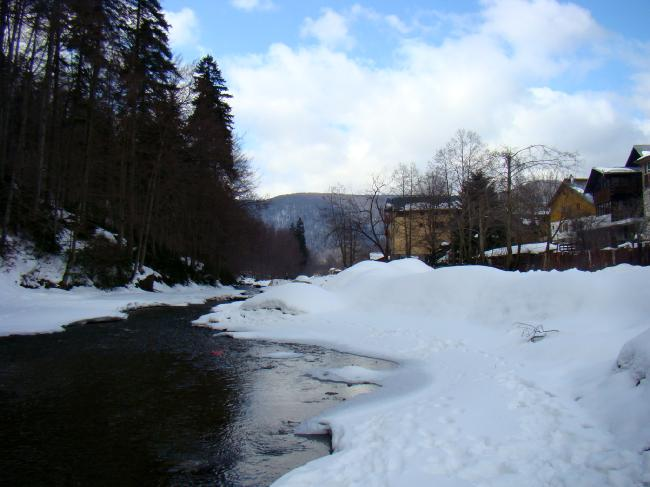

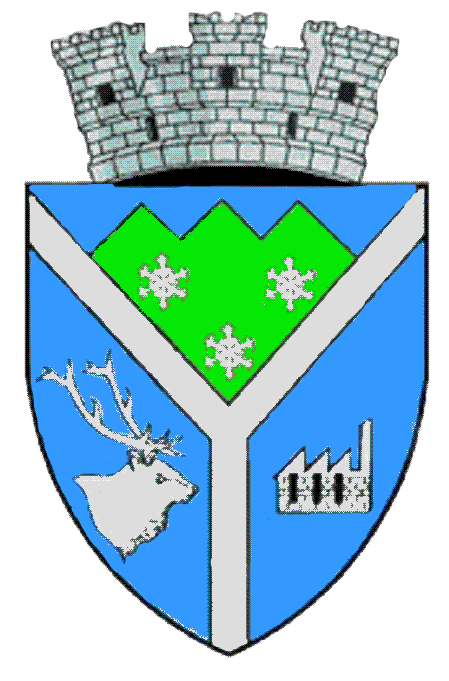
- Coat of arms

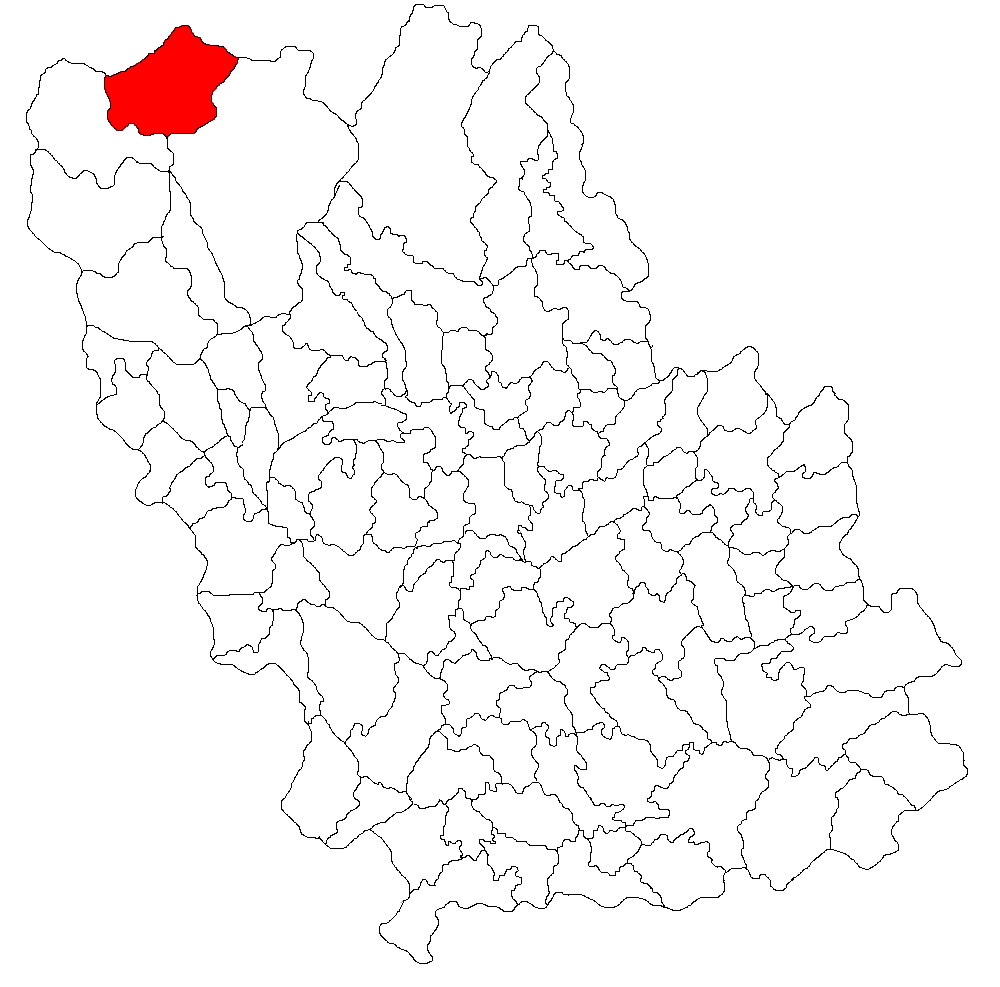
- Location in Prahova County

- Location in Romania
- Coordinates: 45°26′42″N 25°33′19″E
- Country: Romania
- County: Prahova

Government
  - Mayor (2024–2028): Gheorghe-Adrian Purcaru (PSD)
- Area: 83.04 km^{2} (32.06 sq mi)
- Elevation: 930 m (3,050 ft)
- Population (2021-12-01): 3,901
  - Density: 46.98/km^{2} (121.7/sq mi)
- Time zone: UTC+02:00 (EET)
  - Summer (DST): UTC+03:00 (EEST)
- Postal code: 105100
- Area code: (+40) 02 44
- Vehicle reg.: PH
- Website: www.primariaazuga.ro

Historical population
Year	Pop.	±%
1956	3,732	—
1966	4,808	+28.8%
1977	5,397	+12.3%
1992	6,487	+20.2%
2002	6,119	−5.7%
2011	4,289	−29.9%
2021	3,901	−9.0%
Source: Census data

3D rendition of Azuga

Azuga is a small resort town in the mountains of Prahova County in the historical region of Muntenia, Romania. It is located at the foot of the Baiu Mountains and contains several ski slopes, including the longest ski run in Romania, the Sorica. Once heavily industrialized, Azuga contains a bottled water factory, (a leftover from a notable beer factory that brewed Azuga Beer, now produced elsewhere in Romania under license), a sparkling wine factory, wine tasting, and lodging (Cramele Rhein, owned by Halewood International). The town offers a view over the Bucegi Mountains, from street level to the top of the Sorica mountain, where a gondola arrival station is located. Azuga is one of the most famous mountain resorts of Prahova Valley.

Until the winter of 2002, Azuga was known as an industrial town. After that date, the town was turned into a resort to capitalize on the mountain landscape of the Baiu Mountains. Shortly after, the Sorica slope was certified by the International Ski Federation. Today, Azuga houses many hotels and hostels that provide accommodation for tourists. Accommodation in local homes can also be found for a lower price. The town formerly had several other factories including a beer factory, a glassware factory and a wool cloth factory, but those factories were demolished. The refractory materials factory, while still standing, is closed.

== Natives ==
- Stelică Morcov (born 1951), light-heavyweight freestyle wrestler
- Simona Păucă (born 1969), artistic gymnast
- Alexandru Vagner (1989–2022), footballer
- Gheorghe Voicu (born 1950), biathlete
- Ion Zangor (1938–1973), bobsledder

== Climate ==
Azuga has a warm-summer humid continental climate (Dfb in the Köppen climate classification).

Climate data for Azuga
Month	Jan	Feb	Mar	Apr	May	Jun	Jul	Aug	Sep	Oct	Nov	Dec	Year
Mean daily maximum °C (°F)	−2 (28)	−0.4 (31.3)	3.3 (37.9)	8.8 (47.8)	14 (57)	17.3 (63.1)	19.2 (66.6)	19.4 (66.9)	14.8 (58.6)	10 (50)	5.1 (41.2)	−0.1 (31.8)	9.1 (48.4)
Daily mean °C (°F)	−5.8 (21.6)	−4.4 (24.1)	−0.9 (30.4)	4.4 (39.9)	9.7 (49.5)	13.3 (55.9)	15.2 (59.4)	15.3 (59.5)	10.7 (51.3)	5.8 (42.4)	1.4 (34.5)	−3.8 (25.2)	5.1 (41.1)
Mean daily minimum °C (°F)	−9.3 (15.3)	−8.1 (17.4)	−5 (23)	−0.1 (31.8)	5.1 (41.2)	8.9 (48.0)	10.8 (51.4)	11.1 (52.0)	6.9 (44.4)	2.3 (36.1)	−1.5 (29.3)	−6.9 (19.6)	1.2 (34.1)
Average precipitation mm (inches)	46 (1.8)	44 (1.7)	62 (2.4)	93 (3.7)	134 (5.3)	138 (5.4)	136 (5.4)	110 (4.3)	74 (2.9)	59 (2.3)	52 (2.0)	51 (2.0)	999 (39.2)
Source: https://en.climate-data.org/europe/romania/prahova/azuga-12797/

== Tourism ==
The town is an emerging ski resort, with extensive development in tourism infrastructure.

Sorica is a ski slope with a length of over 2,100 metres (6,900 feet) and a vertical drop of 561 m (1,841 ft). The slope is recommended for both beginners and experienced skiers.

There are also two slopes descending the Cazacu Mountain, one is 1,920 m (6,300 ft) long (with a drop of 530 m) and the other, more suitable for beginners, is 400 m (1,300 ft) long, with a drop of 115 m. Slopes are equipped with ski lifts and a Leitner gondola lift, which goes to the top of Sorica slope, allowing skiers to choose between the two main slopes (access to Cazacu slope requires some tens of meters of ascending, possibly by a small ski lift).

Because of the almost constant winds on the ridge during winter, the uppermost station is a few meters below the top. A higher station would have likely had icing issues, making morning startups difficult as sometimes the only alternative is the snow groomer - snowmobiles not being able to travel in fresh high snow.

In the summer, Azuga is a hiking destination, being a starting point for trips to various mountain destinations in Predeal, Bușteni, or Sinaia. Unpaved forest roads attract many bicycle enthusiasts, who can ride along the Azuga River, which is peppered with small wooden artificial waterfalls that oxygenate the water for the many trouts that naturally populate the river.
