= Șotrile =

- Commune
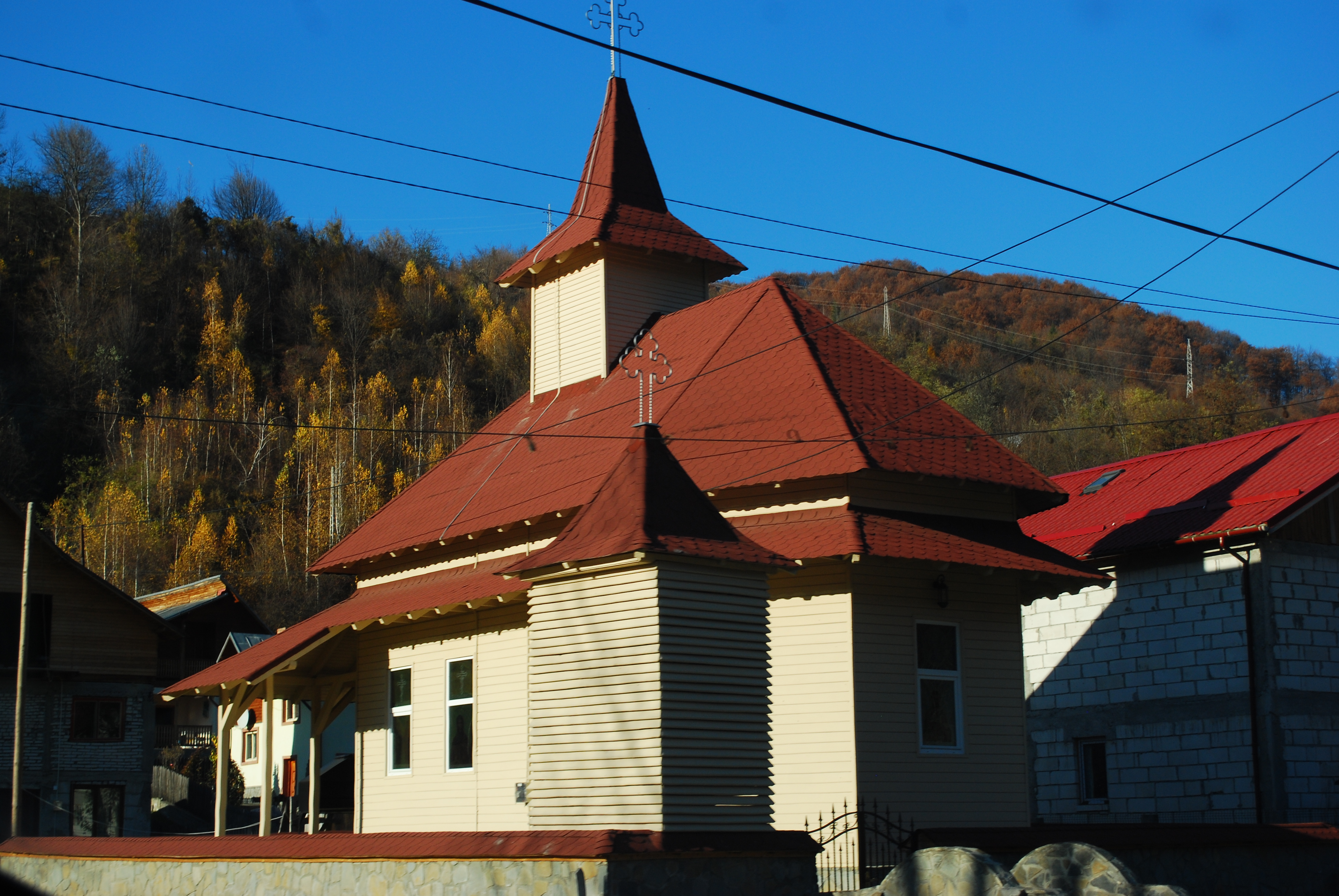
- Church in Seciuri

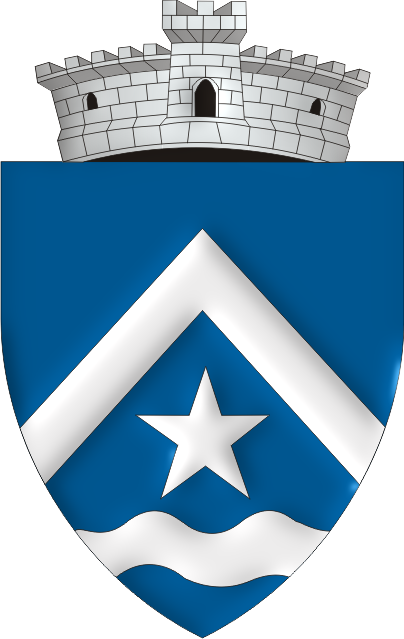
- Coat of arms

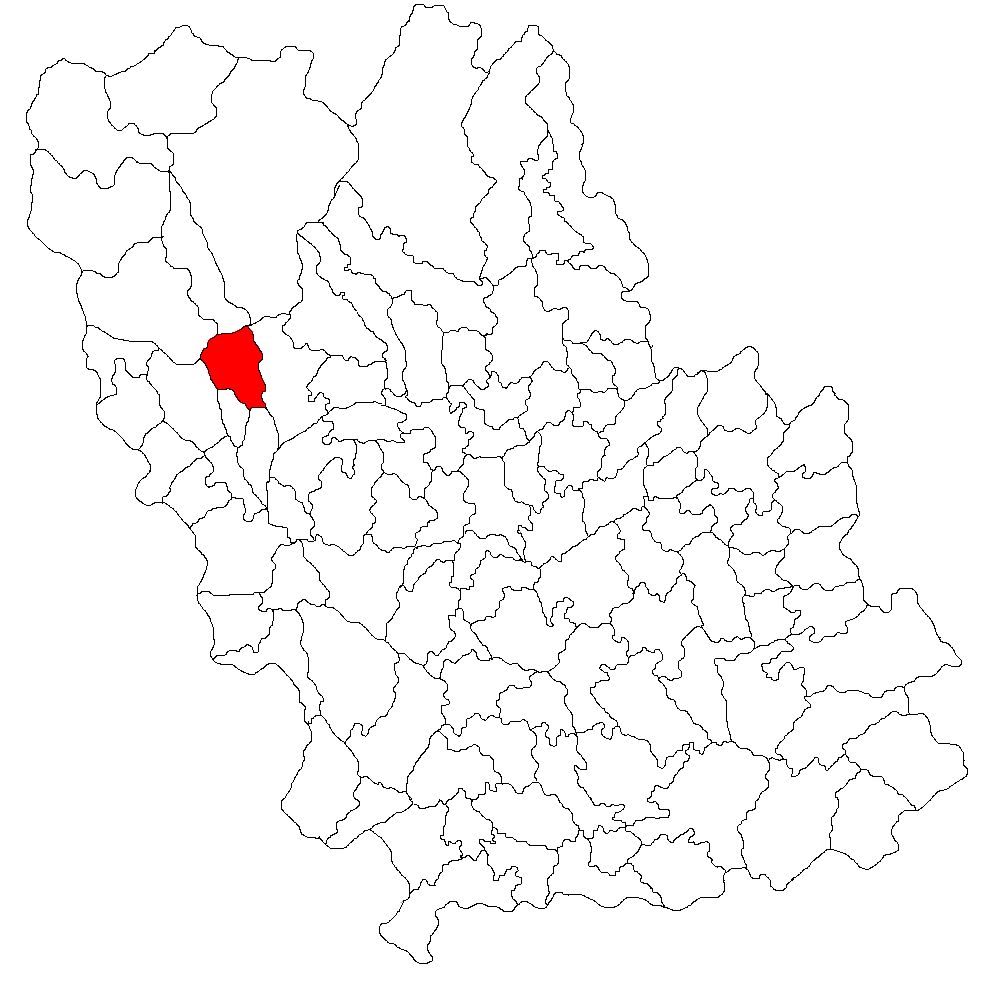
- Location in Prahova County

- Location in Romania
- Coordinates: 45°13′N 25°43′E
- Country: Romania
- County: Prahova

Government
  - Mayor (2024–2028): Elena-Irina Davidescu
- Area: 29.41 km^{2} (11.36 sq mi)
- Elevation: 780 m (2,560 ft)
- Population (2021-12-01): 3,142
  - Density: 106.8/km^{2} (276.7/sq mi)
- Time zone: UTC+02:00 (EET)
  - Summer (DST): UTC+03:00 (EEST)
- Postal code: 107565
- Area code: +(40) 244
- Vehicle reg.: PH
- Website: comunasotrile.ro

Șotrile is a commune in Prahova County, Muntenia, Romania. It is composed of six villages: Lunca Mare, Plaiu Câmpinei, Plaiu Cornului, Seciuri, Șotrile, and Vistieru.

Historical population
Year	Pop.	±%
2002	3,559	—
2011	3,328	−6.5%
2021	3,142	−5.6%
Source: Census data
