= Brebu, Prahova =

Romanian commune in Prahova County, Muntenia

Brebu
- Commune
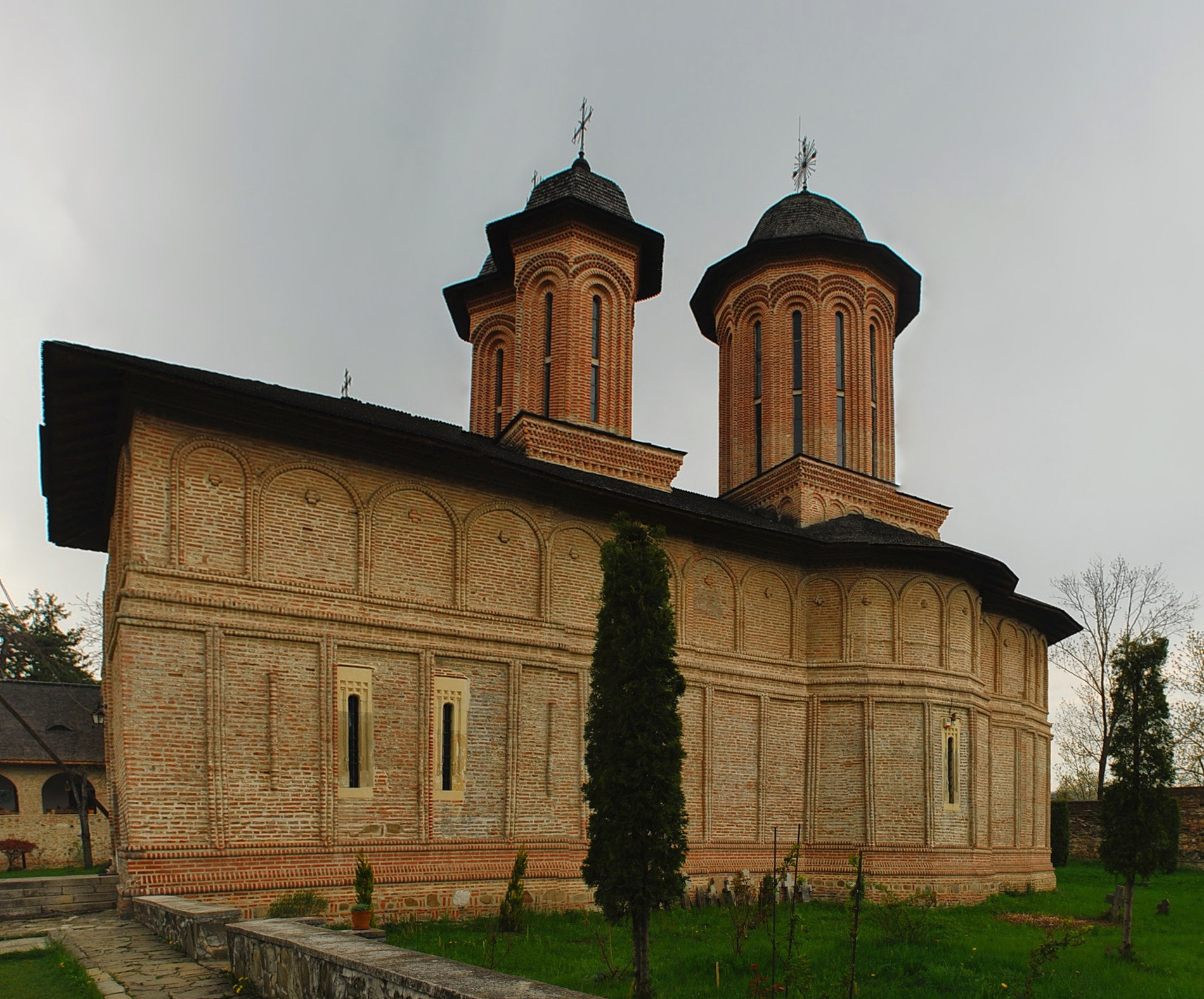
- Brebu Monastery

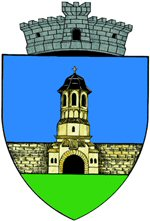
- Coat of arms

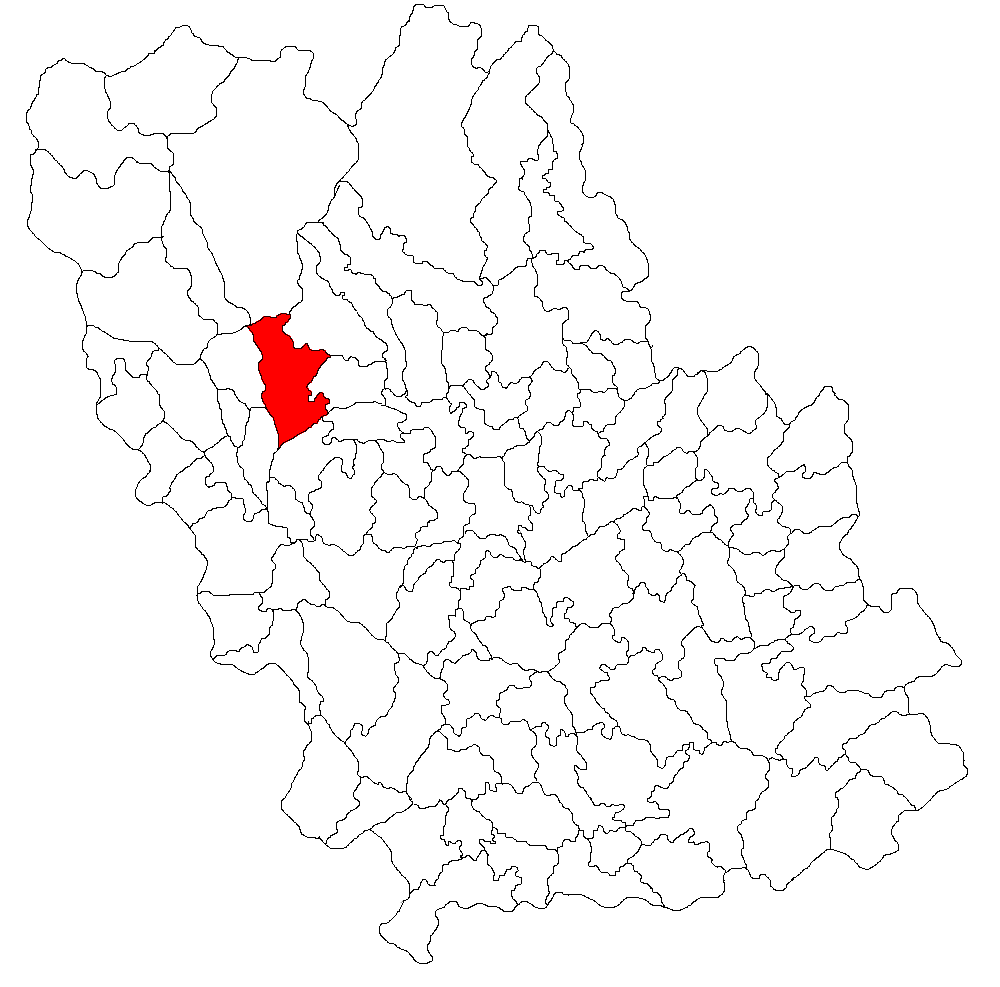
- Location in Prahova County

- Location in Romania
- Coordinates: 45°11′N 25°46′E
- Country: Romania
- County: Prahova

Government
  - Mayor (2024–2028): Adrian Gheorghe Ungureanu (PNL)
- Area: 58.52 km^{2} (22.59 sq mi)
- Elevation: 515 m (1,690 ft)
- Population (2021-12-01): 6,576
  - Density: 112.4/km^{2} (291.0/sq mi)
- Time zone: UTC+02:00 (EET)
  - Summer (DST): UTC+03:00 (EEST)
- Postal code: 107100
- Area code: +(40) 244
- Vehicle reg.: PH
- Website: www.brebuprahova.eu

Brebu is a commune in Prahova County, Muntenia, Romania. It is composed of four villages: Brebu Mânăstirei (the commune centre), Brebu Megieșesc, Pietriceaua, and Podu Cheii.

The commune is located in the northern part of the county. The river Purcaru flows through it.

Historical population
Year	Pop.	±%
1992	7,994	—
2002	7,719	−3.4%
2011	7,103	−8.0%
2021	6,576	−7.4%
Source: Census data
