= Valea Doftanei =

- Commune
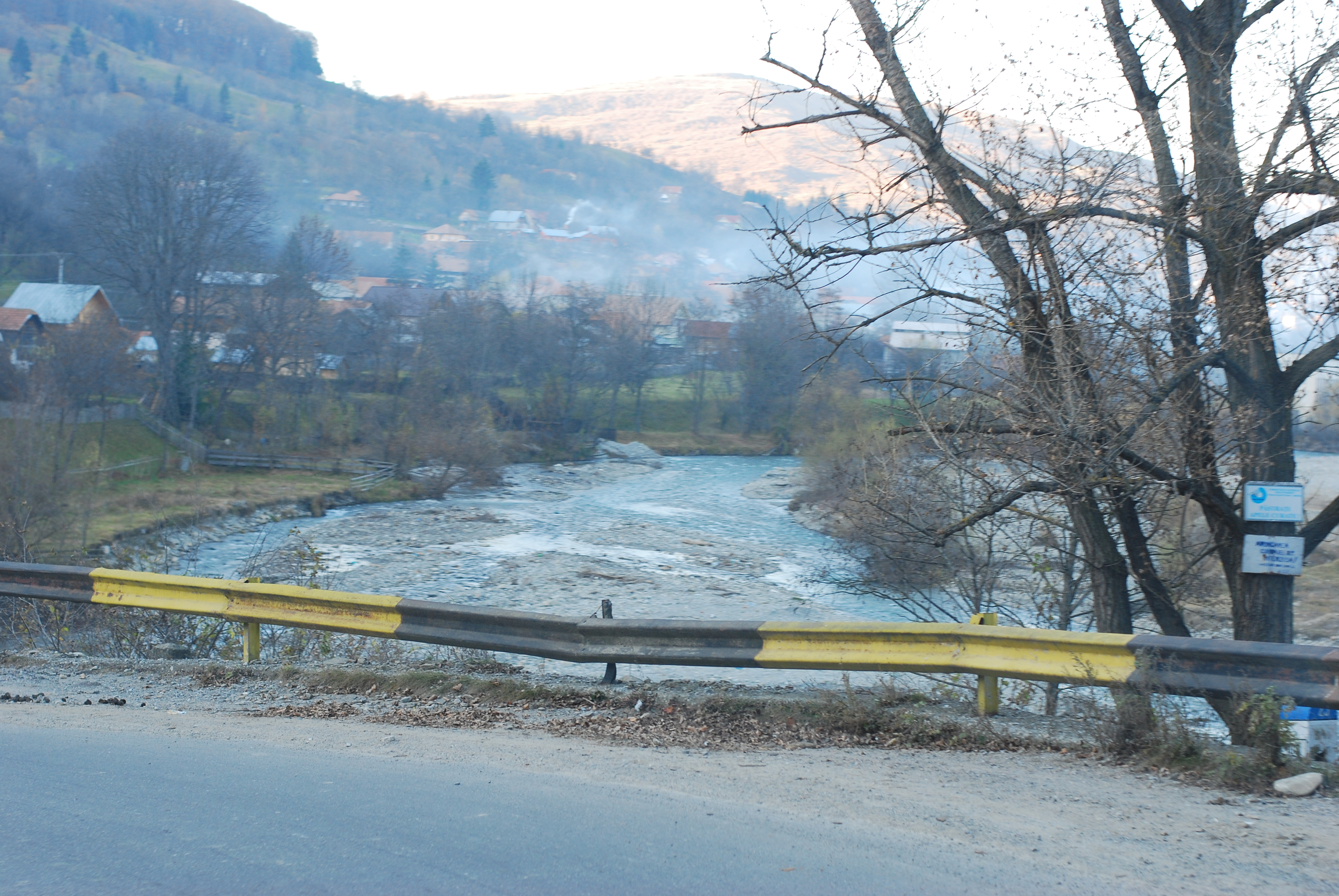
- The Doftana River in Teșila

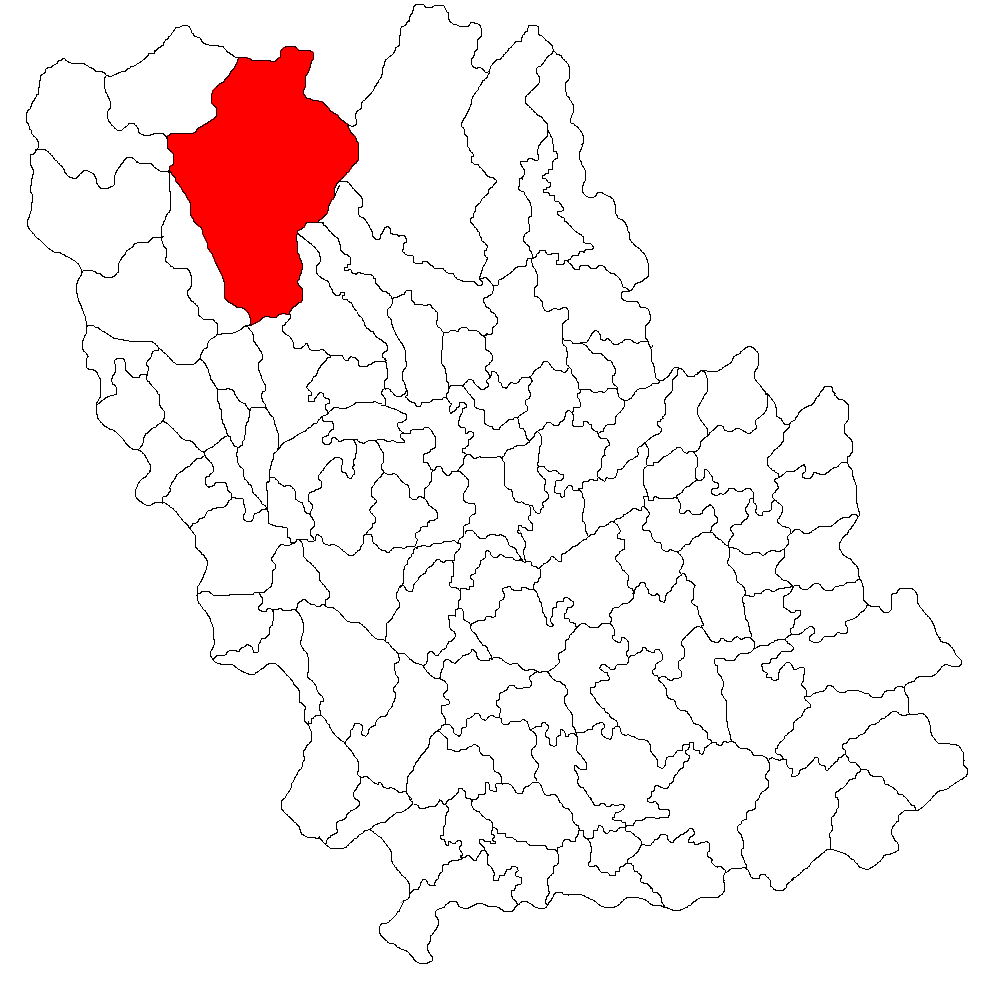
- Location in Prahova County

- Location in Romania
- Coordinates: 45°18′N 25°43′E
- Country: Romania
- County: Prahova

Government
  - Mayor (2024–2028): Lucian-Vileford Costea (PSD)
- Area: 286.37 km^{2} (110.57 sq mi)
- Elevation: 689 m (2,260 ft)
- Population (2021-12-01): 5,706
  - Density: 19.93/km^{2} (51.61/sq mi)
- Time zone: UTC+02:00 (EET)
  - Summer (DST): UTC+03:00 (EEST)
- Postal code: 107640
- Area code: +(40) 244
- Vehicle reg.: PH
- Website: www.primariavaleadoftanei.ro

Valea Doftanei (Romanian for "Valley of the Doftana") is a commune in Prahova County, Muntenia, Romania. It is composed of two villages: Teșila (the commune centre) and Trăisteni.

The commune is located in the northern part of Prahova County, between the Prahova and Teleajen rivers, on the border with Brașov County. It has an area of 286.26 km^{2} (110.53 sq mi). Its population primarily inhabits the central and southern areas, with the north being taken up by mountainous terrain. The river Doftana flows through the commune for some 30 km (19 mi) from north to south before ending in the Paltinu Dam and reservoir.

Historical population
Year	Pop.	±%
1992	7,067	—
2002	6,896	−2.4%
2011	6,162	−10.6%
2021	5,706	−7.4%
Source: Census data

== Natives ==
- Ioan Apostol (born 1959), luger
- Gheorghe Vasile (born 1967), biathlete
