= Baiu Mountains =

Mountain range in Romania

Coordinates: 45°22′N 25°37′E

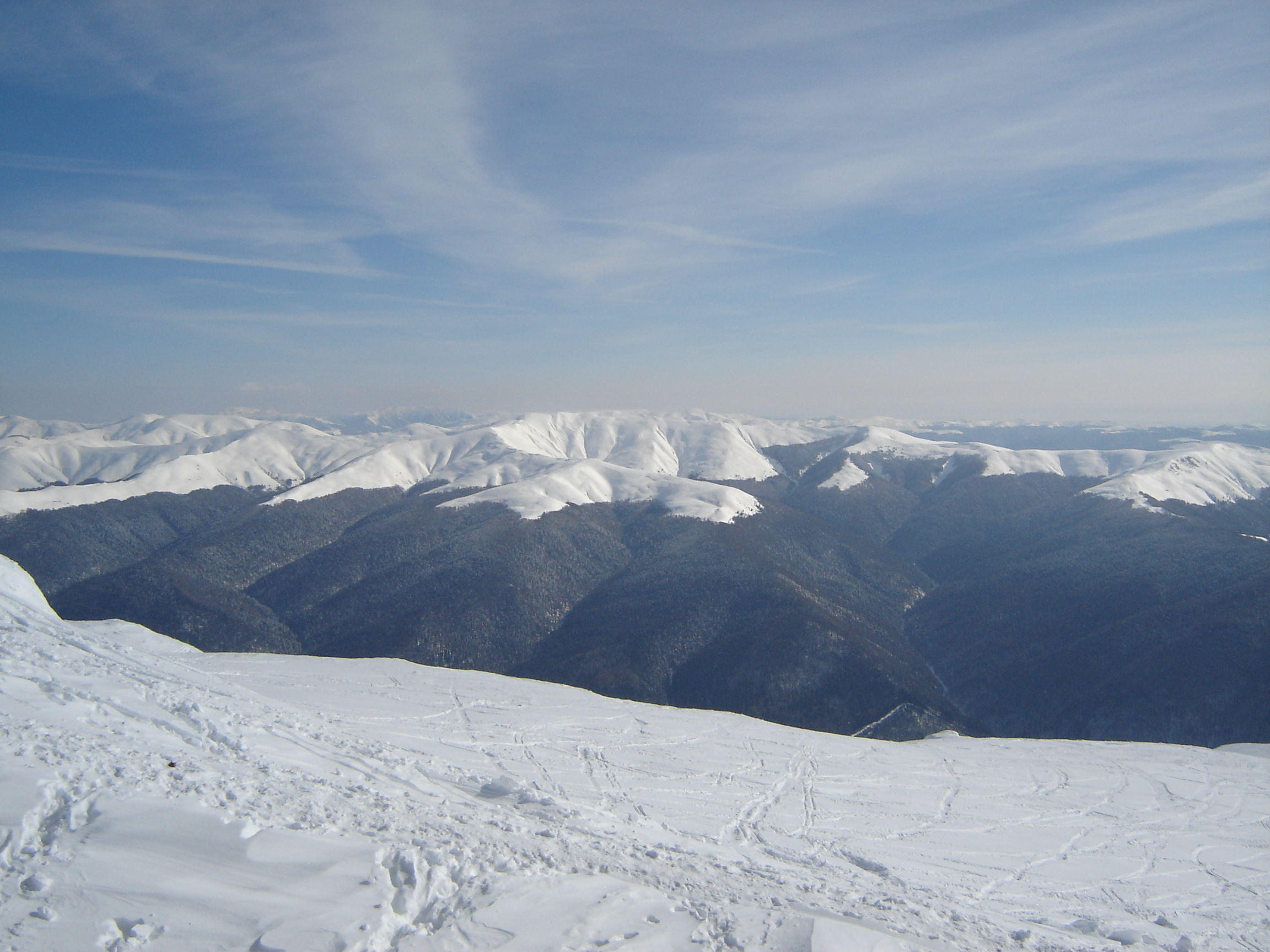
Baiului Mountains

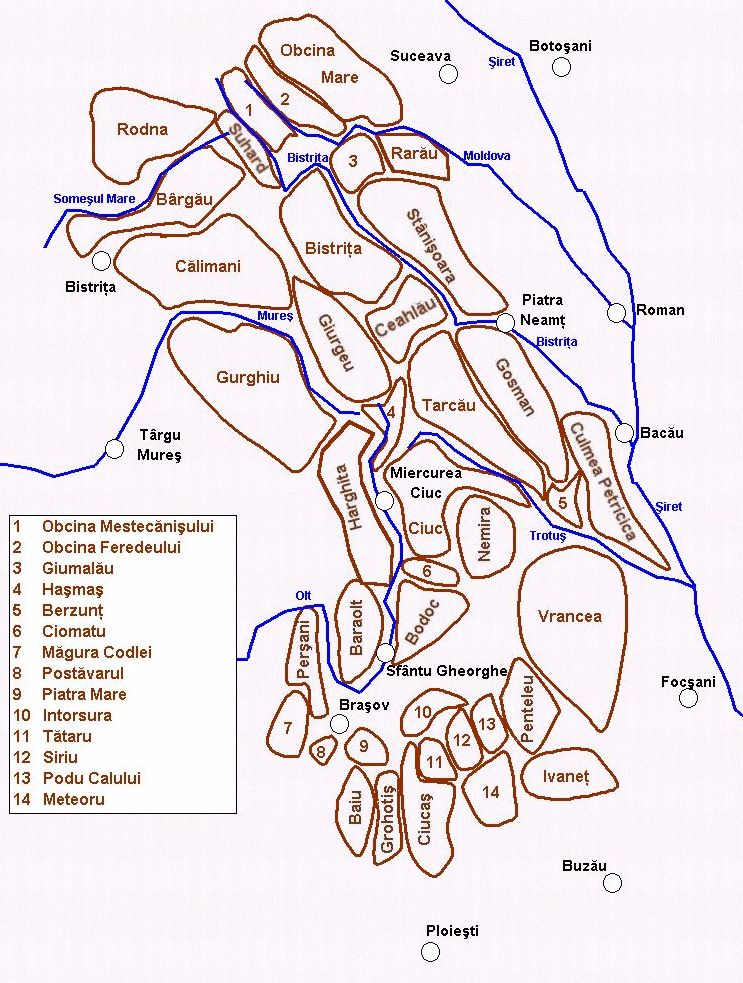
map of Eastern Carpathians, with Baiu at extreme southwest

The Baiu Mountains (Romanian: Munții/Muntele Baiu/Baiul/Baiului/Munții Gârbova, Hungarian: Baj-hegység) are mountains in central Romania, a few kilometers south of Brașov.

Within traditional Romanian classification the Baiu Mountains belong to the Curvature Carpathians. According to the geological divisions of the Carpathians, they belong to the Outer Eastern Carpathians.

The Baiu Mountains run from the Azuga Valley in the North and to the Posada Gorges in the South, and from the Doftana Valley in the East to the Prahova Valley in the West. The mountains have an average elevation of 1,110 m (3,640 ft) and a maximum height of 1,923 m (6,309 ft) at Neamțu Peak, covering an area of about 300 km^{2} (120 sq mi).

The Baiu Mountains lie immediately south of the Gârbova Mountains, a long north-south ridge.

== See also ==
- List of mountain peaks in Romania
- Baiu Mare River
