= Constantin Cantacuzino (died 1877) =

Constantin G. Cantacuzino
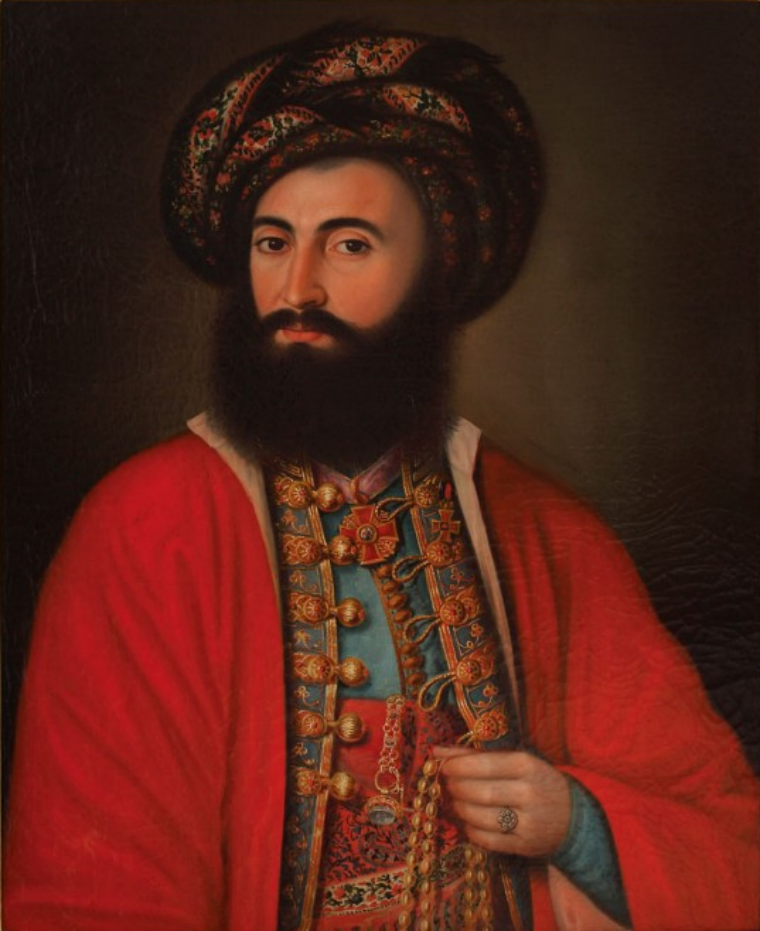
- Cantacuzino with the Order of Saint Anna, c. 1820; portrait attributed to Pavel Đurković

Caimacam (Regent of Wallachia)
- Reign: September 22, 1848 – June 1849
- Predecessor: Princely Lieutenancy (Christian Tell, Ion Heliade Rădulescu, Nicolae Golescu)
- Successor: Barbu Dimitrie Știrbei (as Prince)
- Born: between 1791 and 1800; Constantinople, Ottoman Empire
- Died: 1877 (aged 76–86); Paris, French Third Republic
- Burial: Saint John the Great Church, Bucharest; Bellu cemetery (reburial)
- Spouse: Zoe Slătineanu (married c. 1822; died 1839)
- Issue: Ion C. Cantacuzino; Grigore Cantacuzino; Adolf Cantacuzino; Alexandra (Alexandrina) Manu
- House: Cantacuzino
- Father: Gheorghe (Iordache) Cantacuzino
- Mother: Maricuța Pârșcoveanca
- Religion: Orthodox

Constantin G. Cantacuzino, also known as Costache Cantacozino or Costandin Cantacuzino (transitional Cyrillic: Кonстanтin Кanтaкozino; 1790s–1877), was the Caimacam (Regent) of Wallachia in September 1848–June 1849, appointed directly by the Ottoman Empire. A member of the Cantacuzino family, he had emerged as a leader of the conservative boyardom during the Regulamentul Organic period. As a commander in the Wallachian militia, he organized in 1831 the first elections for Bucharest's Town Council, and subsequently served as one of the Bucharest Governors. He first played a major part in national government from 1837 to 1842, when he served Prince Alexandru II Ghica as Postelnic and Logothete. During that interval, he clashed with his own brother Grigore Cantacuzino, who sided with the liberal current.

Falling out of favor with the Russian Empire, Cantacuzino was deposed ahead of Ghica himself, and was an unsuccessful candidate in the princely election of December 1842. After years in self-imposed exile, Cantacuzino returned with the Ottoman Army in September 1848, helping to quell the 1848 Revolution—although his own son, Ion C. Cantacuzino, had been active within the revolutionary movement. Supervised by Fuad Pasha, Constantin sent the revolutionary leadership, including his immediate predecessors, into exile. He then oversaw the imprisonment and mistreatment of various others, being allegedly responsible for the death in custody of writer Ion Catina. He also disarmed the rebel forces, while restoring both Regulamentul and its symbols of power, as well as reintroducing slavery.

Cantacuzino resigned when Barbu Dimitrie Știrbei took over as Prince, but remained active within Știrbei's successive governments, being granted the office of Great Vornic. He opposed the Prince's views on agrarian reform, taking an ultra-conservative stance which favored indentured servitude for Wallachian farmers. Throughout the early 1850s, Cantacuzino actively sought the crown of Wallachia for himself, championing Ottoman loyalism. His in-law Nicolae Mavros also attempted to make him ruler of both Danubian Principalities.

Cantacuzino's final moment in power was in late July 1854, during an interregnum caused by the Crimean War. He became the president of an Administrative Council created by Mikhail Dmitrievich Gorchakov just before the Russian withdrawal from Wallachia. The Ottomans then recognized him as head of a caretaker government, jointly with Constantin Năsturel-Herescu, although both resigned after Știrbei's second return that September. After rallying with a larger conservative coalition, he served a final ministerial term in 1856, became a minor contender in the princely election of 1859, and was Vice President of the resulting Ad hoc Divan. In this capacity, he streamlined the election of Alexandru Ioan Cuza as Domnitor. While the Caimacam spent the remainder of his life abroad, his sons Ion and Adolf remained active in the administration of the United Principalities. Constantin was the father-in-law of General Gheorghe Manu, as well as the grandfather of microbiologist Ioan Cantacuzino and of poet Scarlat Cantacuzino.

== Biography ==
=== Early life ===
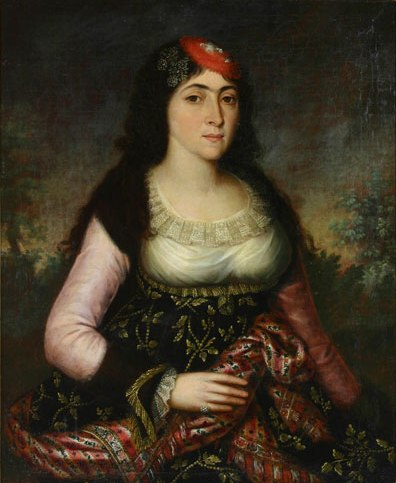
Mihail Töpler's portrait of Maricuța Cantacuzino

Of distant Greek origins, the Cantacuzinos had reached prominence in both Wallachia and Moldavia, which were governed as tributary states of the Ottoman Empire. According to diverging accounts, Constantin was born in 1791, 1793, or "about 1798". His father was the Clucer Gheorghe (Iordache) Cantacuzino (1747–1803), grandson of Constantin I Cantacuzino; through his two paternal great-grandparents, Constantin descended from Michael Kantakouzenos Şeytanoğlu and Prince Radu Șerban. Constantin was born from Gheorghe's marriage to Maricuța, daughter of Ban Ștefan Pârșcoveanu. The couple had another son, Grigore (1800–1849), who also served as Wallachia's Vornic.

Cantacuzino's involvement with the Wallachian administration began during the late stages of the Phanariote era, when both Principalities were being Hellenized. He first became a titled boyar in 1813, under Prince John Caradja, when he was appointed Serdar of the Wallachian military forces; in 1820, he was an Aga, or head of Wallachia's police. In 1821, following the Greek War of Independence and the anti-Phanariote uprising, he and his family took refuge in the Austrian Empire, joining a colony of boyars in Corona (Brașov). An anonymous letter, tentatively dated to April 1821, cites him as one of the boyars attracted into the anti-Phanariote faction of this diaspora, alongside Grigore Brâncoveanu, Scarlat Rosetti and Alexandru Vilara.

The Aga had returned home by 1822, the probable year of his marriage to Zoe Slătineanu, from whom he had his four children. In 1828, under Grigore IV Ghica, he issued the first-ever decree regulating Wallachia's police, which also marked a first step in its transition to modern metropolitan law enforcement. That year, he was also appointed as the first ethnic Romanian to serve as Efor (Curator) of the Wallachian theaters. Cantacuzino's political climb was accelerated during the Russo-Turkish War of 1828, when he welcomed the Imperial Russian Army and became a protege of Governor Pavel Kiselyov. Following the Treaty of Adrianople, both Principalities became protectorates of Russia under Ottoman suzerainty. In 1831, Cantacuzino was Vornic of the Wallachian Police in Bucharest. In this capacity, together with Gheorghe Bibescu he organized the very first elections for the Town Council, which took place in November 1831. When this was convened, he also presented himself as a candidate for an executive function (mădulăr), failing to obtain an absolute majority but advancing to the second round. He ultimately earned endorsements from 56 out of 80 councilors, and, after validation by Kiselyov on November 28, emerged as one of five town governors. Still serving as Aga in 1832, Cantacuzino was directly involved in the hunt for brigand Ioniță Tunsu. Kiselyov also assigned him to committees which supervised the paving and beautification of Bucharest's streets; his colleagues were Barbu Dimitrie Știrbei and Alecu Filipescu-Vulpea. With Iancu Văcărescu and Costache Golescu, he also collected funds for the establishment of a national theater. His own townhouse, located outside Lipscani, was fitted with a bathhouse—one of the few private ones existing in 1830s Wallachia.

In parallel, Cantacuzino also ran in Wallachia's first legislative election, taking one of the 19 Ordinary Assembly seats reserved for the high-ranking boyars. After the election of 1836, there were protracted debates between the National Party and the conservative boyars. A ministerial crisis was finally ended in June 1837, when Cantacuzino agreed to enter a cabinet that also included his rival Știrbei. He served as Postelnic or Secretary of State, and was also Logothete or Justice Minister. He contributed to the pacification of Brăila in July 1841, signing Prince Alexandru II Ghica's proclamation to the rebellious Bulgarians. Acting on Ghica's behalf, he welcomed at Calafat the Ottoman inspector, Hüseyin Pasha, with whom he discussed means of tackling Russian intrigues in Wallachia.

By 1842 Logothete Cantacuzino had been received into three orders of chivalry by Wallachia's protective powers: he had the Order of Saint Anna, Second Class; the Order of Saint Vladimir, Fourth Class; and the Ottoman Order of Glory. His friendship with Kiselyov afforded him a say in the legislative framework of Wallachia, codified as Regulamentul Organic. From within the Ordinary Assembly, Cantacuzino supported tagging the controversial "additional article" to Regulamentul, and thus revealed himself as a vocal backer of Russian influence in the Principalities. This pitted him against the National Party, whose leaders included Emanoil Băleanu, Ioan Câmpineanu, and his own brother, Grigore Cantacuzino.

Constantin was still a member of the Assembly following the election of 1841. However, on May 20, 1842, Russian commissioner Alexander Osipovich Duhamel obtained that he be deposed as Postelnic and replaced with Știrbei. Cantacuzino presented himself as a candidate in the princely election of December, but only managed 41 of 188 votes; the winner was Bibescu. Initially, Bibescu promoted him, assigning him office as an Efor of the Wallachian schools, jointly with Filipescu-Vulpea and Mihalache Ghica. Like his brother Grigore (who sat in the Assembly's committee for educational review), Constantin was a reactionary who objected to educational reform. Still present in the Assembly in 1843, he soon rallied with the anti-Bibescu opposition, blocking his legislative projects. He later chose to expatriate himself, although his family remained behind. His eldest son, Ion C. (Iancu), was married from 1846 to Maria, daughter of the numismatist and Russian spy Nicolae Mavros. This made Constantin in-laws with politician Ion Ghica and with the Kotzebue family.

=== 1848 takeover ===
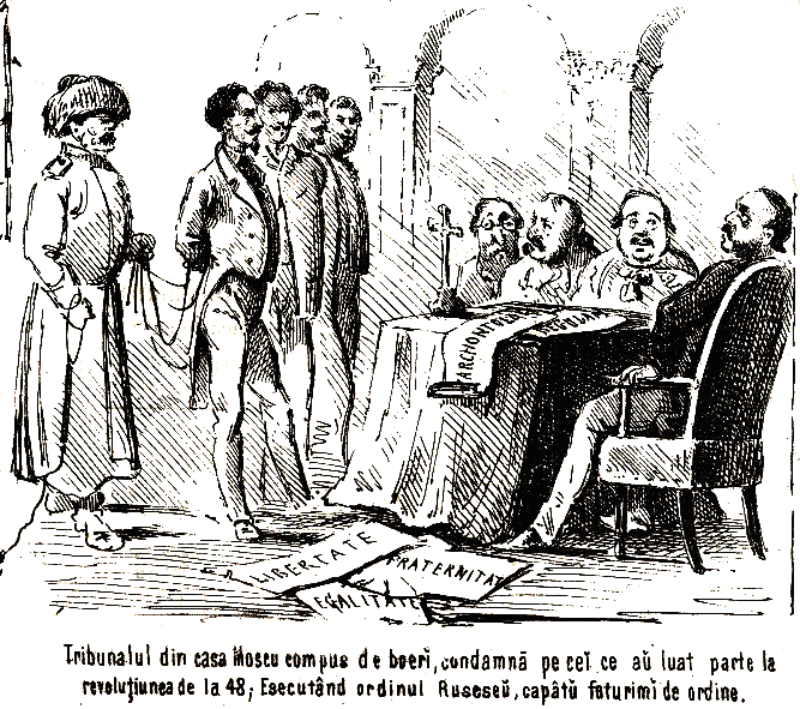
Participants in the Wallachian Revolution of 1848 prosecuted by boyars. Political allegory in Ghimpele, 1868

In June 1848, Wallachia's liberal revolution toppled Bibescu and installed a Provisional Government. Two of Cantacuzino's three sons, Ion and Grigore, were enthusiastic participants in the events. The former served on the Regeneration Club (which grouped the most committed radicals) and its Central Electoral Committee. In the early stages, both Constantin and his Mavros daughter-in-law helped the radical Nicolae Bălcescu evade police round-ups at Telega. On June 11, the day of revolutionary victory, he wrote to Bălcescu a congratulatory and "rather humble" letter. During the subsequent weeks, the new regime sought to obtain recognition from the Sublime Porte. The Cantacuzino home was also where the Provisional Government, represented by Ioan Voinescu II, welcomed Suleiman Pasha in August.

In September, following its radicalization, the revolutionary movement was repressed by an Ottoman–Russian expedition; at the time, Cantacuzino Sr had again fled for safety to Corona. On September 21, he rode back to Bucharest, presenting his services to the Ottoman Army under Fuad Pasha; reportedly, he had been called back by Duhamel. Favored by both Russian and Ottoman overseers, he was subsequently appointed Caimacam by Fuad, on September 22. The short ceremony was witnessed by Ion Cantacuzino, who reportedly shouted out: "Father, do not accept this sort of offices!" In early October, Fuad communicated to Cantacuzino the guidelines he had been issued by Abdulmejid I: "his imperial majesty the sultan has persistently recommended that I erase all trace of the revolution."

Constantin's ascendancy led to the mass arrest of revolutionary leaders, who were then kept under armed guard at Cotroceni Monastery. His acts became the topic of a protest, submitted to Âli Pasha, the Ottoman Foreign Minister, by revolutionary agents Ion Ghica and Abdolonyme Ubicini. According to Ghica, Âli informed them that Cantacuzino had only been appointed Caimacam because Reshid Pasha had mistaken him for his more reformist brother. By then, the Revolution's triumvirate of Princely Lieutenants had dispersed: though Christian Tell and Nicolae Golescu suggested armed resistance, Ion Heliade Rădulescu resigned and retreated to his home, leaving the palace to be taken by Ottoman soldiers.

On September 24, Fuad and the Caimacam issued a deportation order for some of the core figures of the previous regime. The list included Bălcescu, Heliade, Voinescu II, and Nicolae Golescu, alongside Costache Aristia, Cezar Bolliac, Ion C. Brătianu, Dimitrie Brătianu, Ștefan Golescu, C. A. Rosetti, and Ioasaf Znagoveanu. Cantacuzino's other preoccupation as Caimacam was an investigation into looting and arson by rebellious peasants, for which purpose he founded and led a specialized boyar committee. In tandem, he and Fuad ordered Neofit II to expel revolutionary sympathizers from the ranks of his Wallachian Orthodox Bishopric. Assigning the direct supervision of education to Băleanu, Filipescu-Vulpea, and Petrache Poenaru, he initiated the purge of radical teachers, and, on November 1, personally ordered for all schools to be shut down.

Ordering the remnants of the revolutionary army, under Gheorghe Magheru, to disband, Cantacuzino took hold of the arsenal of weapons collected by the deposed Lieutenants. He sent these arms to the Transylvanian Saxons, who used them in battle against the Hungarian State. Magheru later claimed that his own estate in Gorj County had been devastated on orders from the "Phanariote" Caimacam and from his regional commissioner, Nichita Formacu. During January, Duhamel reportedly asked Cantacuzino to send in the Wallachian military forces to assist in the invasion of Hungary, but he refused to comply. Instead, the Caimacam made sure the border with Hungary to be fully closed, in hopes of preventing revolutionary exports; his orders resulted in the arrest and expulsion of Magheru's wife, who had attempted to return to Wallachia. By May 1849, Cantacuzino had allowed Austrian soldiers fleeing Transylvania to recover on Wallachian soil. This decision was met with a note of protest from the British consul Robert Gilmour Colquhoun, who found that it breached the London Straits Convention. It also endeared Cantacuzino to the Austrians, who presented him with the Order of Leopold. An Austrian spy, Captain August von Wimpffen, suggests that his was the most valuable assistance provided to the beleaguered soldiers.

The Caimacam sacked the poet Grigore Alexandrescu from his bureaucratic office, suspecting him of harboring revolutionary ideas. Cantacuzino was also credited with ransacking Heliade's home and with various acts of cruelty—seen as responsible for the prison death of poet Ion Catina, which his regime tried to conceal. Catina's brother was allegedly forced to deny that was the case, in a newspaper notice which also addressed thanks to the Russian army. According to a Heliade disciple, Nicolae Rusu Locusteanu, the new regime imposed an "executioner" in each Wallachian county. Though he endorsed additional clampdown measures, Cantacuzino was a moderate in this respect: Colonel Grigore Lăcusteanu, who organized the round-up, recalls that Fuad ordered him to limit the scope of his investigations, and also to submit to the Caimacam's every command.

=== Tolerant mood and Știrbei's rise ===
Both of Constantin's sons remained engaged in subversive activities, of which he may have been aware. In November 1848, Ion Cantacuzino was arrested by Cossacks in the Russian service. He was eventually released from Cotroceni, and then successfully intervened to free another revolutionary, Nicolae Kretzulescu. In March 1849, Grigore organized a theatrical representation at Momolo's in Bucharest, with proceedings going to Hungarian revolutionaries in exile. Though this event went against Russian and Ottoman edicts of censorship, the Caimacam "pretended not to notice the revolutionary character and scope of the party", allowing it to run its course. A month later, however, Cantacuzino was preparing judicial procedures against all those who had protested against the Ottoman invasion—as reported at the time by Colquhoun, this would have resulted in sentencing for a great many Wallachian youths. Archival research has uncovered a June 1849 letter by Cantacuzino to the authorities of Romanați County, demanding them to be on the lookout for anyone who wished to commemorate or reignite revolution.

On September 28, 1848, Caimacam Cantacuzino and Fuad annulled the abolition of slavery, ordering the emancipated Romanies to return to their masters. During February 1849, a commission led by I. C. Borănescu reported that the revolutionary government had unlawfully spent 1.4 million thaler; Cantacuzino ordered this deficit to be covered by confiscating the revolutionaries' private property in Wallachia. The Caimacam personally investigated Colțea Hospital, thereafter alleging that the deposed regime had grossly neglected its patients. He also had a direct say in Wallachia's industrialization when, in March, entrepreneur V. G. Browning presented him with designs for a large gristmill and bread factory. Additionally, Cantacuzino set aside funds for the restoration of Bucharest's Monument to the Russian Soldiers, which had been nearly completely vandalized during the Revolution. His municipal policies blended with repressive measures when he demoted Alexandru Orăscu, previously Bucharest's council architect, and promoted Xavier Vilacrosse. He staged an inquiry into Iacob Melic's activity as a revolutionary architect, ordering him to pay back sums he owed to the city government of Bucharest and to Clucer Barbu Catargiu, and sequestering some of his assets. He also made sure to reemploy Catargiu at the Justice Department, noting that "his honesty and competence demand his participation in the most serious affairs of state". Lăcusteanu's attempt to arrest Melic's father-in-law, Hagi Nazaretian, was curbed by a riot of the local Armenians.

As argued by military historian Theodor C. Văcărescu, Cantacuzino "governed in name only", with real power being exercised by Fuad and, to a lesser degree, by Russian commissioner Alexander von Lüders. During the Cantacuzino regency, and without Ottoman consultation, Wallachians were made to pay for the upkeep of Russian troops, with earlier tributes being increased by 20% for the 1848 fiscal year. The government was also forced to accept a loan of 300,000 rubles, most of which went to paying for the upkeep of the Russian occupation force—meaning that Russia turned a profit from the expedition. The national militia was at the time placed under a Russian commander, Anton Horbatsky (Horbațki). Cantacuzino intended to make the arrangement permanent by being recognized as Prince. "Not unfounded" rumors claimed that he paid Fuad a large bribe to obtain his support against the rival Știrbei. This project was backed by Nicolae Mavros, who also wanted Cantacuzino to take the Moldavian crown. Nevertheless, Mavros also proposed as a better candidate the Duke of Leuchtenberg. During 1849, the exiles continued to maneuver against Wallachian reactionaries: writing from Istanbul, Bălcescu insisted that the Caimacam was a Russophile who "feigned friendship with the Turks."

Cantacuzino's mandate expired in June 1849. As early as November 1848, he had presented himself as a candidate for the Wallachian throne—though, as noted by the Piedmontese diplomat Francesco Mathieu, neither he not Bibescu stood a chance against Știrbei, the Ottoman favorite. As reported by Văcărescu, Știrbei had additional Russian support; Știrbei could afford to bribe Mustafa Reşid Pasha at a level which exceeded Cantacuzino's financial power. As he returned to the country, Cantacuzino and his sons handed in their resignations. That moment also marked the peak of Duhamel's participation in Wallachian affairs, as Știrbei soon turned against his Russian backers. His bipartisan cabinet included Cantacuzino, purposefully selected among his rivals to serve as Logothete. On August 23, he was advanced to Great Vornic and cited as "honest and faithful to His Highness". His 1848 victim Bolliac claimed that Cantacuzino had amassed a fortune from "things he stole while in office", having also received a prize of 25,000 ducats. The latter sum was ordered to be paid from the Wallachian treasury by Ottoman Sultan Abdulmejid I, who also granted Cantacuzino a snuffbox encrusted with precious stones. Știrbei took offense with this new duty, and, according to diverging sources, either refused to grant Cantacuzino the sum, or only paid it in installments. He also signed an order ending Cantacuzino's investigation of the peasant revolt.

The former Caimacam remained involved in the agrarian debates, opposing measures to liberalize transactions between boyars and tenant farmers. Against Știrbei's own recommendations, he supported keeping peasants under a system of leases which closely resembled indentured servitude. As Știbei's Vornic or Interior Minister in 1849–1850, Cantacuzino introduced more leniency toward imprisoned liberals, assessing pleas for amnesty and reporting on revolutionary Tănasie Macovei's sufferings from scrofula. However, he also recommended that the agitator Teodor Borcănescu be arrested and exiled to Poiana Mărului Monastery. According to the Știrbeist Ioan Maiorescu, the Vornic was helping the Russians prolong their occupation by sponsoring a false-flag rebellion; Știrbei, realizing the scope of the intrigue, responded by deposing his own cabinet. In June 1851 Cantacuzino and his rival Bibescu were both visiting the French Republic, both of them courting the Wallachian revolutionaries in exile, ostensibly to win their support for their own candidacies for the throne. News of this infuriated Bălcescu, who suggested "that we kick these slick ciocoi [buzzards] in a certain spot on their bodies." By November 1850, Maria Mavros-Cantacuzino had also joined Bălcescu in exile, writing back to Vasile Alecsandri about their "fraternal intimacy".

=== Return to power ===
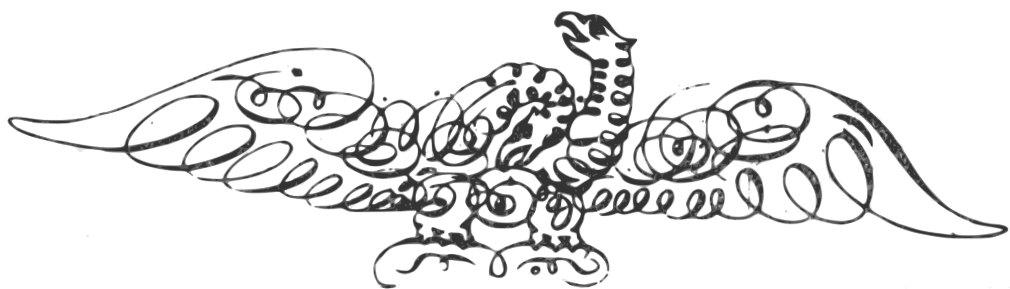
Calligraphy of a heraldic hybrid: the Wallachian bird and double-headed eagle of the Cantacuzinos; from Caimacam Cantacuzino's copy of his family's genealogy

From October 1853, Russia and the Ottoman Empire fought with each other in what became known as the Crimean War. Știrbei left the country and Wallachia's fate remained uncertain. On July 31, 1854, the withdrawing Russian army, under Mikhail Dmitrievich Gorchakov, assigned Wallachia's administration to an Administrative Council, presided upon by Cantacuzino. Immediately after, he wrote to the Duke of Teschen, inviting the Austrian army to occupy Wallachia as a buffer zone. On August 7, Iskender Pasha entered Bucharest with ten Ottoman Cossacks, meeting Cantacuzino for advice on how to run the transition of power. Also in early August, Cantacuzino welcomed in his home Halim Pasha, whose small expeditionary force restored an Ottoman presence in Bucharest; Austria's consul Anton Ritter von Laurin was also present. Presiding over a delegation that also included Câmpineanu and Alexandru II Ghica, Cantacuzino presented Sadyk Pasha and his Cossacks with the keys to the city. Halim and Sadyk recognized him as a provisional governor, with the two other Wallachian boyars serving as his aides. Later that month, Cantacuzino similarly welcomed the Austrian troops, under Count Coronini, clearing the Mavros palace to serve as their headquarters.

Again hoping to be made Caimacam or Prince, Cantacuzino also welcomed Omar Pasha and lent him a luxurious carriage. On August 31, Dervish Ibrahim Pasha partly satisfied Cantacuzino's request, appointing him and Constantin Năsturel-Herescu to lead a provisional government which was to handle affairs until Știrbei's promised return. The new Council also included Ion Cantacuzino and another young boyar, Ioan Alecu Filipescu-Vulpache. According to the memoirs of Sadyk Pasha, the new regime also involved Alexandru Ghica and Câmpineanu; it was primarily pro-Ottoman, fearing Russia and, "above all", Austria. Grigore Cantacuzino was included in this administrative apparatus: with Sadyk and Carol Davila, he took measures to control the cholera epidemic, earning kudos from the Ottoman overseers.

Constantin Cantacuzino and other "old boyars" found themselves tactically allied with Heliade and the Golescus in their repeated attempts to prevent Știrbei's return from Austria. Wimpffen recorded the former Caimacam as saying: "this country would be so beautiful — if only for once she were to know, is she Turkish, or Russian, or Austrian — or Wallachian [emphasis in the original]." Wimpffen criticized the government as "befuddled. [...] The only good thing one can say about Cantacuzino's administration is that he always strove to prevent the various calamities that befell his country, with his personal example. According to whim and necessity, [it was] Orthodox or Mohammedan, Anglo–Turkish or Austrian, here and there nationalistic [...]. Aiming to please everybody, it never created itself a party, only seeking to coalesce the airs of various nonentities." On September 9, Wallachian patriots, including Cantacuzino, organized in Bucharest a grand ball in honor of Sadyk and Iskender—a French observer, Eugène Jouve, viewed this as a tactless display, since the presence of both Pashas was "more insulting to Turkey's allies than to her enemies."

Cantacuzino finally resigned on September 23, when Știrbei appointed an entirely new cabinet. Wimpffen sees his departure as content and "harmless to all"; he also contends that Cantacuzino could always have resurfaced to serve as a "dummy" under a more "Machiavellian" ruler. During the following years, Cantacuzino was mainly noted as a patron of the arts. In 1855, he sponsored a debut play by lawyer Ioan Em. Bujoreanu, Fata supt epitrop ("Chaperoned Girl"). Probably at that stage, he commissioned a calligraphic and heraldic copy of his family's genealogy, originally written in the late 18th century by his ancestor, Mihai Cantacuzino; it remained one of the few surviving copies of the work. An 1861 notice in O Theatis newspaper described him as "one of the most constant and enthusiastic spectators of [Bucharest's] Greek theater."

=== Ad hoc Divan and later life ===
In February 1855, Maiorescu recorded in Vienna the activities of a Cantacuzino clique, which reunited Constantin and Ion in an effort to topple Știrbei. In September, he wrote indignantly that Cantacuzino Sr was paying Carol Sweder to publish seemingly independent praise of him and his defunct regime in Journal de Francfort, Der Wanderer, and other papers of the German Confederation. In late 1856, as Alexandru Ghica presided upon a new Wallachian regency, the former Caimacam briefly returned as minister. That year, the revolutionary exile Dimitrie Bolintineanu published his political tract, L'Autriche, la Turquie et les Moldo-Valaques, which contended that Cantacuzino was incompetent and unreliable when it came to supporting the Western powers. After an initial attempt to get the throne for himself, Ion Cantacuzino rallied with the Știbeist party, which now sought to effect union between Wallachia and Moldavia. A member of the Ad hoc Divan for Prahova County following the election of 1857, he helped to draft its main resolutions. On October 16, 1857, Abdulmejid awarded him the Order of the Medjidie, Second Class.

In 1858, Cantacuzino was Știrbei's envoy to Iași, allegedly gathering support for the unionist cause. A Cantacuzino faction still existed ahead of the January 1859 election, but was undecided between supporting three conservative candidates for the throne: Bibescu, Știbei, and Alexandru Ghica. Both father and son took seats in the Divan (or Elective Assembly): Aga Ion was reelected at Prahova, while the former Caimacam took the boyar vote in Teleorman, along with Ioan Slătineanu and Serdar C. Apostolescu. Eventually, on January 12, Constantin put himself up as a princely candidate—although, as historian Nicolae Iorga notes, his chances of winning were minuscule. Twelve days later, progressives imposed a win for their own surprise candidate, Alexandru Ioan Cuza, a Moldavian. As Vice President of the Assembly, Constantin validated the election, noting that there was no legal act preventing Moldavians to be put up as candidates; he also signed the address which sought to obtain Cuza's recognition as Domnitor. Some of his 1848 enemies, including Rosetti and Nicolae Golescu, also endorsed that act.

During the remainder of his term, Cantacuzino, like Catargiu and Dimitrie Ghica, advocated strict fiscal conservatism against radical proposals for increased government spending (though, against Catargiu's recommendations, he insisted that past administrations, who had increased the public debt, needed to be awarded immunity from prosecution); at the time, his son was serving as Wallachian Justice Minister. Cantacuzino was sent to the Wallachian Chamber of Deputies in the recall elections of 1860 (when he was one of the deputies who redacted the response to Cuza's inaugural message) and 1861. He was joined by his son Adolf, elected for Muscel County in the by-elections of June 1861.

In 1862, the conservative legislature voted for Catargiu as the first-ever Prime Minister of Romania. On June 8, 1862, Catargiu was shot and killed by an unknown person as he was leaving Chamber; Constantin Cantacuzino was one of the witnesses to this event, having offered Catargiu his own carriage for transportation. Around mid-1864, Cantacuzino the elder was still residing in Bucharest, receiving there visits from Arthur Seherthoss, who represented the Hungarian National Directorate, trying to gather support for a rekindled struggle against Austria. He and his guest were beginning to collaborate with each other when Cuza ordered Seherthoss to "leave the country within 48 hours." The former Caimacam also left Wallachia at some point. He settled in Paris, dying in exile in 1877.

== Legacy ==
The Caimacam was buried next to his wife (died 1839) and parents at Saint John the Great Church in Bucharest. When this building was demolished, their remains were reburied at Bellu cemetery, Plot 15. His palatial complex in Bucharest had been neglected, and was considered for expropriation by the state. As reported by philologist Ioan Bianu, by 1880 the "court" included a "deserted and almost ruined palace", next to a "large waste-ground, infested by weeds." Constantin was survived by all his four children. Ion remained especially prominent as a minister of the United Principalities, and from 1863 one of Cuza's leading conservative opponents; his youngest brother, Adolf Cantacuzino (married to Ecaterina Iarca), was inaugural President of the Court of Appeals. Having returned to Bucharest, Maria Mavros was noted for her philanthropic work during the Romanian War of Independence. In 1857, Constantin and Zoe's only daughter, Alexandra or Alexandrina, had married General Gheorghe Manu, who later became Prime Minister of the Romanian Kingdom. She died in 1916.

While Ion and Maria Cantacuzino had nine children together, Grigore died a celibate in 1903. Of the Caimacam's granddaughters, sisters Zoe and Sevastia became wives of two other Prime Ministers: the former married Dimitrie Sturdza, the latter Petre P. Carp. Also a Prime Minister, Gheorghe Grigore Cantacuzino was Constantin's nephew. Other descendants of the Caimacam included two famous grandsons: microbiologist Ioan Cantacuzino, born to Maria Mavros, and Adolf's son, the poet and diplomat Scarlat (Charles-Adolphe) Cantacuzino. During their lifetime, their grandfather's image in culture had been codified as negative, with literary historian Gheorghe Bogdan-Duică referring to the Caimacam as "one of the most undeserving boyars this country ever had". Constantin was also portrayed as an antagonist in Camil Petrescu's historical novel, Un om între oameni.
