= Ioniță Tunsu =

Romanian outlaw and folk hero (d. 1832)

- Fanciful depiction of Tunsu. Engraved illustration for one of N. D. Popescu-Popnedea's novels (1881)
- Born: Ioniță c. 1800; Optași, Olt County, Wallachia
- Died: 19 August 1832 (aged 31–32); Bucharest, Wallachia
- Cause of death: Gastrointestinal perforation from gunshot wound
- Resting place: Pantelimon (outside Mărcuța Church)
- Occupations: Hajduk; sexton
- Years active: 1821–1832
- Criminal charges: Banditry
- Reward amount: 1,000 Thaler (1832)
- Wanted by: Wallachia; Moldavia; Russian Empire
- Accomplices: Codin; Nicolae Grozea; Captain Radu; Udincă

Details
- Date apprehended: 18 August 1832

Ioniță Tunsu or Tunsul ("The Trimmed", or "The Defrocked"; c. 1800 – 19 August 1832) was a Wallachian brigand (hajduk, hence Tunsu[l] haiducul) who received posthumous status as a folk hero. Born to a rural deacon of the Wallachian Bishopric in the Romanian Orthodox Church, he served as a sexton and was preparing for a while to take over as parish priest. He chose instead a career in the criminal and rebellious underworld of Bucharest; he was probably pushed into it by witnessing injustices accumulate during the final stages of the Phanariote regime, and is credited by several historians as an active participant in the Wallachian uprising of 1821. He persevered after the end of the Phanariotes, when he acquired fame for his daring exploits, as well as for his protection of the poorest Wallachians. During the Russo-Turkish War of 1828–1829, Tunsu expanded his activities deeper into the countryside, selectively terrorizing the boyar aristocracy. As the Danubian Principalities became a dominion of the Russian Empire, under terms codified in Regulamentul Organic, he continued to defy the authorities, and sometimes carried out raids into Moldavia.

The Russian governor, Pavel Kiselyov, made it his mission to neutralize Tunsu, but wanted it done humanely—he was positively impressed when the hajduk, who could stalk Kiselyov at will, announced that he would not assassinate his rival. The local police, led by boyars Iordache Filipescu and Constantin Cantacuzino, had instructions to begin a manhunt, and a prize was promised for anyone willing to betray Ioniță. Combined forces of Wallachian militiamen, Arnaut mercenaries and commandeered Cossacks were several times eluded by Tunsu and his band; relying on supporters throughout the land, the outlaws moved with relative ease, and Tunsu even appeared publicly in Bucharest. He was ultimately betrayed by his godson, the double-dealing policeman Radu, who helped Kiselyov's men with organizing a stakeout at Grozăvești. Tunsu's band was largely destroyed during the resulting shootout, and Tunsu himself was gutted by a bullet.

Ioniță survived for several hours, and was operated on by Kiselyov's surgeons, but his intestines had been damaged beyond repair. His dead body was exhibited, but only drew in sympathetic crowds; it was then buried at some distance from Mărcuța Church, in a grave that the authorities agreed to mark with a wooden monument, paid for by the national treasury. After being first glorified in Romanian folklore as early as the 1830s, Tunsu was the main character of an 1840 story attributed to Russia's Alexander Veltman. He was discovered by Romanian literature during the United Principalities era, when Simeon Mihălescu reused elements of his biography for a comédie en vaudevilles, and Vasile Alecsandri wrote verse commemorating him. His legend was more fully explored and codified by novelist N. D. Popescu-Popnedea, who helped consolidate his posthumous cult over several generations.

== Biography ==
=== Origins and early activities ===
The future hajduk, who signed himself mononymously as "Ioniță", was from the village of Optași, in the original Olt County (on Muntenia's inner-Wallachian border with Oltenia). Local tradition reports that his childhood home was in the hilly area, called Vâlceaua Stânii. His father served as the village deacon. Ioniță is believed to have been born at some point in the early 1800s, when Wallachia, a vassal state of the Ottoman Empire, was being governed by Greek-speaking Phanariote Princes. Aspiring to join the clergy, around 1817 he moved to Bucharest, the Wallachian capital, and began serving as sexton at Old St. George Church—also undertaking training to become a priest. He became a protege of Ilarion Gheorghiadis, the Bishop of Argeș, who encouraged him in this effort. As reported by oral historian Dimitrie Papazoglu, Tunsu was always a cultured man. He would habitually read the early newspapers put out by Ion Heliade Rădulescu and Zaharia Carcalechi, and could converse in Russian. Some unverifiable reports suggest that he worked for a while as a Logothete at a boyar's court, while still others (including those presented by novelist Gala Galaction) have him as the resident sexton of Sfinții Voievozi Church, on Calea Târgoviștei, northern Bucharest.

Tunsu's brigandage overlapped with the large-scale peasant uprising of 1821, and the subsequent downfall of the Phanariotes. Historian Tiberiu Ciobanu proposes that Ioniță was pushed into his conspiratorial career as an outlaw by "the inequities of the regime that had taken hold of the country after 1821". Researchers such as George Potra and Claudiu Cotan suggests instead that the future outlaw was originally a volunteer in Tudor Vladimirescu's army during the anti-Phanariote uprising. Papazoglu contrarily believes that he was inspired to become a hajduk by a personal friend, Nicolae Grozea, who had already taken up that activity; also according to Papazoglu, Ioniță cut off his hair, which meant voluntarily renouncing his career in the church, then assembled his original band not from social marginals—Romanies who had served as servant torchbearers or lamplighters (masalagii) for the local boyardom, including a man named Udincă or Dincă. Potra suggest that the latter claim is a calumny, and that Tunsu's core partisans were "men who had themselves greatly suffered in their lifetime."

Wallachians began to take notice of Tunsu around 1825, when he carried out his first successful attacks—and, as Ciobanu notes, revealed himself as a resolute defender of the lower classes; Tunsu's other characteristic at that stage was that he only struck urban areas, usually in cooperation with Grozea. According to Ciobanu, he still resided for a while in St. George's yard, confident that the remote mahala of Moșilor, which housed that church, was largely unfamiliar and inaccessible for regular law enforcement. In the 20th century, a resident of Banu Manta area, in northern Bucharest, circulated claims that Tunsu had also been hiding out in that neighborhood, which, during the 1820s and '30s, was riddled by "immense pits", used for sand mining. Tunsu also took advantage of his close relationship with Captain Radu—known in some records as Ștefan, which may indicate that his full name was "Radu Ștefan". The latter was an officer in the post-Phanariote police force, who was his godson, and who was hiding him in his own home. Later investigations revealed that Tunsu was also godfather of Radu's two daughters, and had sent the family numerous gifts, including a white steed.

=== Heyday ===
In 1827, the former sexton, having brought together a band comprising Wallachian and Transylvanian outlaws, as well as a number of South Slavs, began raiding the countryside. He was especially after boyars and landlords, punishing them for their alleged mistreatment of sharecroppers. As acknowledged by Papazoglu, he was generally humane, leaving his victims enough cash "to get by", and handing out alms to the poor he met along the way. The war of 1828 brought Wallachia and neighboring Moldavia into the Russian Empire's orbit. Occupation by the Imperial Russian Army had disastrous consequences, since it facilitated a spread of the bubonic plague. During that interval, boyar families, including the Ghicas, fled Bucharest for their more isolated rural estates; it was in that context that a young Ion Ghica met Tunsu at Ghergani. As reported in Ghica's old-age memoirs, Tunsu, already famous as a Wallachian "Fra Diavolo", casually showed up on the Ghicas' doorstep, instructing them not to dine out in the open field, since this was taunting "the boys" (meaning that he could no longer vouch for the Ghicas' safety). As the writer notes, this treatment contrasted Tunsu's dealings with other boyars: "Some ten days before this, [Tunsu] had 'ran over' Tache Ralet, our neighbor and cousin, at his estate of Cocoșul; he had taken his shawls, his utensils, his silverware, everything. He had left him and his lady only with the shirts on their backs."

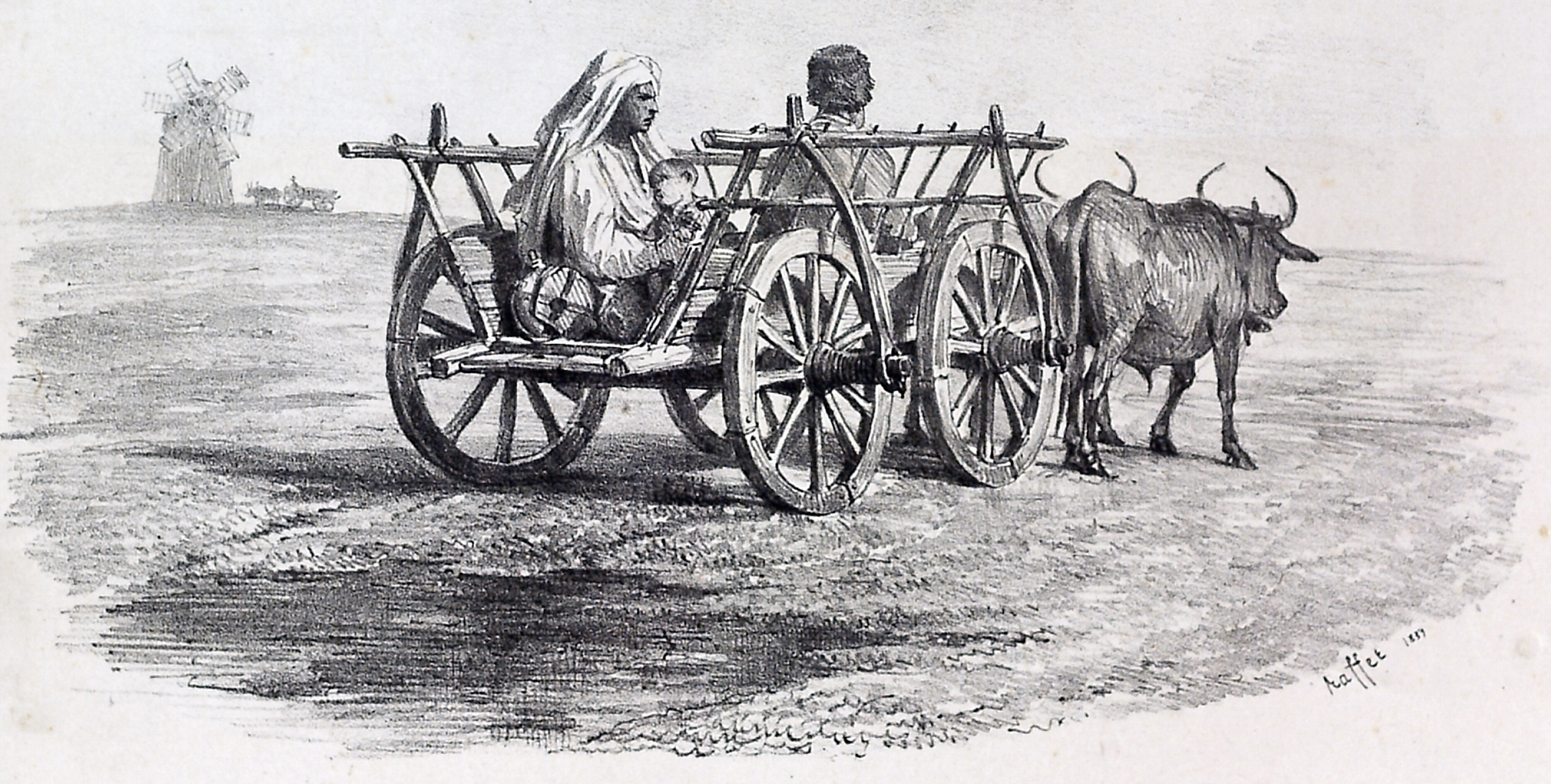
Wallachian peasants in a family wagon; 1837 sketch by Auguste Raffet

Tunsu continued his brigandage after the war, and represented the push-back of peasants and burghers against further encroachment by the Regulamentul Organic regime, which doubled as a Russian dominion over both countries. He began raiding westward into Oltenia, and also harassed the authorities of Moldavia, unwittingly ensuring that the police forces in several countries would take a direct interest in catching him. Tunsu was also identified as a liability by General Pavel Kiselyov, who was serving as governor of Wallachia under the Regulamentul regime, and who ordered his suppression. Ioniță mocked this effort when, following a lead by Captain Radu, he stalked Kiselyov as he made his way by carriage to Târgoviște; he then sent Kiselyov a letter providing personal details of his trip. He meant to unsettle his rival, writing therein that: "Your Excellency's head was today in my rifle's sight; I never thought of killing you, for doing so would have meant killing off a father whom the country adores; but through this I ask of you that you also tell your minions not to have me killed, once they will catch me, for I myself have killed no one."

Relying on peasant solidarity and secrecy, Tunsu eluded or decimated virtually all the posses sent to capture him. Papazoglu believes that Kiselyov was well impressed by the letter, ordering his Vornic, Iordache Filipescu, not to kill off the rebel; he also promised that Tunsu's captors would be rewarded with a boyar's rank and 1,000 Thaler in cash. Filipescu was given a short deadline to handle the matter, and threatened with demotion if he did not succeed. This prompted him to reach out to the Aga, Constantin Cantacuzino, ordering a manhunt throughout Ilfov County—it was to be more directly handled by Cantacuzino's second-in-command, Mihalache Cincu. The authorities could only gain the advantage after Tunsu was betrayed by Captain Radu.

As reported by this informant, Tunsu was by then in Bucharest every other Monday, venturing into coffeehouses, reading the press, and meeting with his collaborators in Mernani Forest. Other sources, rendered by writer Nicolae Vătămanu, suggest that he made regular visits to Sfinții Voievozi mahala, where he kept a woman as his lover. Confronted with such details, Captain Ispir organized a large force of Wallachian militiamen and Cossacks, who encircled the forest. Tunsu escaped again, pretending to be a policeman himself. He duped Ispir into believing that he himself had been robbed of his money by the hajduk bands, and even obtained a Cossack escort on his way out of Mernani; he then rejoined his fellow brigands in the open field, disarmed his guards, and fled into the surrounding old-growth forest, Codrii Vlăsiei.

=== Killing ===
During August 1832, Ioniță was eventually lured into a trap at a bridge over the Dâmbovița in Grozăvești, which was back then an independent locality west of Bucharest. He was using that route with some regularity: either traveling together with Grozea and other members of his band, in a two-horse wagon, as a way of making their way into Cotroceni, or riding his white steed out of Cotroceni and into Codrii Vlăsiei. Filipescu's Arnauts and Cossacks conceived of hiding under the bridge as he passed over it, as a way of ambushing him. This was the second of two stakeouts: in their first attempt, the lawmen had mistakenly shot at another wagon, which carried Colonel Govorov. Though embarrassed when Govorov's servant was shot and instantly killed, the authorities took this to mean that the ambush tactic would work. Arriving in from Cotroceni with Radu by his side, Tunsu was tipped off by the shots he heard. Radu tried to stop him from turning back, explaining the shots as a mahala party ahead of the Dormition fast.

The ambush was postponed for the following Sunday, which fell on 18 August. This time around, the stakeout involved not just the Arnauts, but also an entire company of Wallachian soldiers, under Captain Boboc, assisted by Cincu's posse. In the variant recorded by Potra, Captain Radu accompanied his godfather to the bridge under the cover of darkness, then spurred his horse and joined the Cossacks across the bridge, giving them the signal to fire. Udincă and Grozea were also traveling with Ioniță; in the resulting shootout, they were both either instantly killed or, according to other accounts, merely wounded, and forced to seek safety by jumping out into the Dâmbovița. Their leader was severely wounded in the abdomen, resulting in gastrointestinal perforation: he shouted to Cincu, who had offered to nurse him, that "my guts are nearly halfway out"; he was found incapacitated, among an outgrowth of basket willow. Tunsu was then taken into custody, carried out by his respectful enemies to a nearby location, Procopie's Gardens.

Kiselyov and his retinue showed up immediately. The governor ordered his personal physician, identified by Potra as Alphonse Marsille, to transport Ioniță into a private home on what is presently Calea Plevnei, in downtown Bucharest. Cantacuzino's official account indicates that another hajduk, Codin, was also wounded in the shootout, and similarly transported for medical treatment. A team of doctors, including Apostol Arsache, were asked to operate on Ioniță. According to Ciobanu, Tunsu bled out to death in front of the investigators, having refused to cooperate; Papazoglu contrarily reports that the surgeons sealed a secondary wound on his back, but that they never managed to extract the bullet from his abdomen, and "greatly tormented him" in the process. Kiselyov arranged for a Russian Orthodox priest to administer the last rites, but Bishop Ilarion also showed up, and heard Tunsu's confession. He reportedly asked the brigand to reveal the location of his treasure-trove, with Tunsu explaining that there was no such thing, since his money had been spent on helping the destitute.

According to Papazoglu, Tunsu eventually "gave up the ghost" at dawn on 19 August, with the physicians still tending to his wound. As a sign of his contextual importance, his death was announced by means of Wallachia's government gazette. Initially, his body was left up exposed for a public viewing, which prompted peasants to show up and express their sympathies; one old man, whose family he had helped, left a silver coin of bereavement. As reported mainly by Papazoglu, the funeral arrangements were made by Filipescu and Radu. The latter transported the body out of the city, and selected a trench in the open field, outside Mărcuța Church. He placed it in the trench, covered it with earth, and marked it with a whitewashed plank, on which he wrote his godfather's name. The more detailed accounts indicate that Codin, who also died in custody, was buried in the same spot, under the same plank. They also mention that the plank was in fact a tall landmark made of oak—a Carlo the Painter had received 153 Thaler from the state treasury, in exchange for this work.

== Legacy ==
Apparently, all but three of Tunsu's surviving accomplices had been captured by November 1832. Tortured, they were sentenced to various terms in penal servitude; their captors, meanwhile, were rewarded with money and commendations (the list of names included 27 Wallachians and 15 Cossacks). Captain Radu was never rewarded for his cooperation. He was instead identified by the examining magistrates as one of Tunsu's original henchmen, and had to spend some two months in jail—he was paroled upon Cantacuzino's intervention. As noted by Potra, both Tunsu and Grozea were immediately lionized by Romanian folklore, who preserved their memory in numerous verse works, as well as in children's games. One of these is mentioned in a poem by Constantin D. Aricescu, who suggests that boys were playing one such game, al lui Tunsul joc, in Muscel County. Bucharesters remembered his meetings with his lover, and, by 1850, her home street became known as Tunsului ("Tunsu's"; it was later renamed after Ecaterina Teodoroiu). A hamlet of Optași, which became locally famous in the interwar period for adopting the name of "Paris", preserves its own traditions about Tunsu. Into the 21st century, its inhabitants claimed that the local church houses the hajduk's remains; supposedly, the original bell, stolen by the Wehrmacht during World War II, called out "Tunsu" whenever rung.

The first written record of a Tunsu ballad appears in Anton Pann's collection of "worldly songs", printed in 1837. Tunsu's struggle with the authorities, fashioned into a folk tale, was picked up by the Polish emigre Michał Czajkowski, who adapted an serialized it for Le Constitutionnel newspaper. The legend was integrated within Russian literature before being rediscovered by Romanian literature. An eponymous novella was published in 1840 by Odesskyi Al'manah. Its author, credited under the quasi-Romanian pseudonym "Radul Kuralyesko" (or "Curalescu"), was identified by literary scholar Eufrosina Dvoichenko-Markov as Alexander Veltman. The story, noted for its vivid descriptions of Bucharest and its near-exact renditions of Romanian verse, had been translated into Romanian by Alecu Donici; neither he nor the literary critics of that era could identify Veltman as the author.

In May 1858, shortly before Moldavia and Wallachia fused with each other as the United Principalities, actor Simeon Mihălescu wrote and produced a two-act vaudeville called Tunsu Haiducul ("Tunsu the Hajduk"). Set to music by Eduard Wachmann, it was one of several plays evidencing a mounting interest in brigands as romantic heroes. The melodies were in fact lifted from older quasi-folkloric sources, originally compiled by Lăutar Dumitrache Ochi-Albi, while the plot was largely a "localization" of Lauzanne de Vauroussel's Capitaine de voleurs. The play was still being performed in late 1861, with Ștefan Vellescu as one of the leads. In his diary, Vellescu expressed his true feelings about Mihălescu, describing his work as a "two-bit buffoonery", largely copied from texts by Matei Millo. The work was also panned in 1862 by the journalist Nicolae Filimon, who saw Wachmann's music, advertised as "national", as in fact "cosmopolitan", in line with the Lăutari's acculturation. The underlying style was seen by Filimon as a blend of Romanian peasant, Romani, and Ottoman music.

In the early 1870s, an adventure novelist, N. D. Popescu-Popnedea, created a hajduk genre, which included a cult of figures such as Tunsu and Iancu Jianu. Both were cast as "social outlaws", in narratives which blended folkloric inspiration with the standards of neo-romanticism. Papazoglu, who began putting out his historical works and memoirs during that decade, left a chapter on the Tunsu affair. Potra finds that this work, outlining the hajduk's betrayal and death, was both "painful and captivating". A dramatic work, inspired by Popnedea and similarly detailing Tunsu's death, was shown by Iorgu Caragiale's troupe. It survives in a manuscript penned by his nephew, Ion Luca Caragiale, in March 1870, and, upon being published in 1986, was attributed to another member of that family, namely Costache Caragiale. The sexton's demise also inspired another play, called Mórtea lui Tunsu haiducu. It used poems by Vasile Alecsandri, and was taken up by Mihail Pascaly's troupe during its 1874 tour of Romanian communities in Austria-Hungary; G. Popescu appeared as Ioniță, his performance being rated by Familia magazine as "rather overdone."

Popnedea's encomiums were contrasted by Ion Ghica's recollections, who simply described Ioniță in mundane, unflattering terms. In the emergent Kingdom of Romania, critical scholarship attempted to distinguish between mere robbers (or "common thieves") and genuine hajduks, seen as "noble robbers". This distinction was favored in the 1910s by Dimitrie Marmeliuc, who placed both Tunsu and Jianu in the inferior category. Such interventions failed to challenge the emerging myth, and, as noted in 1947 by scholar Dinu Pillat, Tunsu and Jianu had effectively replaced Alexandrian legends as the main focus of the Romanians' imagination. With the creation of a Communist Romania in 1948, the distinction between hajduks and thieves became more relevant. As historian Bogdan-Vlad Vătavu notes, this era introduced "the first thoroughly documented historical studies on banditry", but added the filter of Marxist historiography, with Tunsu and the others evaluated through their perceived level of class consciousness. Reportedly, Nicolae Ceaușescu, an Olt County native who served as communist leader between 1965 and 1989, was first informed about Tunsu and Jianu through childhood stories told by his peasant mother. Potra, who similarly grew up reading Popnedea stories and recalls being greatly touched by them, noted with regret that, by the 1980s, adolescents no longer remembered who Tunsu and the other hajduks were. A Ioniță Tunsu comic book, created by Puiu Manu and Marius Lestaru, was showcased by the Craiova Art Museum in May 2014.
