= Sârbii-Măgura =

- Commune
- Location in Romania
- Coordinates: 44°33′N 24°43′E
- Country: Romania
- County: Olt
- Population (2021-12-01): 1,789
- Time zone: EET/EEST (UTC+2/+3)
- Vehicle reg.: OT

Sârbii-Măgura is a commune in Olt County, Muntenia, Romania. It is composed of a single village, Vitănești. This was part of Optași-Măgura Commune until 2004, when it was split off.
