= Optași-Măgura =

- Commune
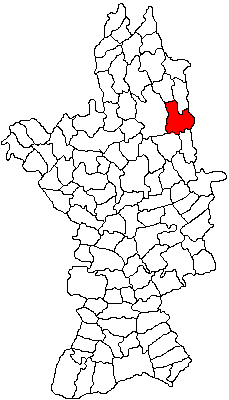
- Location in Olt County

- Location in Romania
- Coordinates: 44°35′N 24°39′E
- Country: Romania
- County: Olt

Government
  - Mayor (2020–2024): Marin Scurtu (PSD)
- Area: 29 km^{2} (11 sq mi)
- Elevation: 205 m (673 ft)
- Population (2021-12-01): 1,095
  - Density: 38/km^{2} (98/sq mi)
- Time zone: EET/EEST (UTC+2/+3)
- Postal code: 237301
- Area code: +40 x49
- Vehicle reg.: OT
- Website: primariaoptasimagura.ro

Optași-Măgura is a commune in Olt County, Muntenia, Romania. It is composed of a single village, Optași. It also included the village of Vitănești until 2004, when it was split off to form Sârbii-Măgura Commune.

== Natives ==
- Ion Predescu (1927 – 2020), politician and judge
- Ioniță Tunsu (c. 1800 – 1832), outlaw
