= N. D. Popescu-Popnedea =

Romanian prose writer

N. D. Popescu
- Zincography of Popnedea in 1905
- Born: August 9, 1843; Bucharest, Wallachia
- Died: June 1921 (aged 77); Bucharest, Kingdom of Romania
- Occupations: Archivist; civil servant; publisher; folklorist
- Writing career
- Pen name: Popnedea, Nedea Popescu, Nicop, Po-pu-ki
- Period: c. 1864–1921
- Genres: Swashbuckler; historical fiction; adventure novel; biographical novel; sentimental novel; adventure novel; novella; autobiography; fantasy literature; feuilleton; political satire
- Movements: Romanticism; Neo-romanticism; Poporanism

Nicolae D. Popescu, also known as Poppescu, Popnedea and Nedea Popescu (August 9, 1843 – June 1921), was a Romanian prose writer, oral historian, almanac compiler and archivist, made famous and financially successful by his hajduk stories. Of peasant origin, he was born in Wallachia and spent his youth in the United Principalities. His career in the civil service began in 1861, while his debut as a writer occurred some three years later, with a romantic biographical novel on Radu the Handsome. Popnedea later began taking his inspiration from Romanian folklore, creating a novella based on Meșterul Manole's semi-historical legend, before single-handedly inventing the hajduk subgenre of the swashbuckler—mixing in the adventure novel and historical fiction—and experimenting with the sentimental novel. Committed to both Hohenzollern monarchism and Romanian nationalism, he exploited the contemporary War of Independence, which infused both his story papers and his contribution as a popular historian. His work also intertwined with his support for the National Liberal Party, of which he was a founding member.

Highly successful in all the novelistic genres he embraced, as well as a collector and publisher of music, Popescu also tried his hand as a playwright, with his Păstorița Carpaților being successfully staged by the National Theatre Bucharest on two separate occasions. He was rejected by the professional writing community in the newly established Kingdom of Romania, and made aware of his marginality. He was openly mocked on several occasions by the celebrated Romanian humorist, Ion Luca Caragiale; his unprofessional approach to history-writing and folkloristics was also critically examined by authors from the Junimea society, who advised against using him as a source. Popnedea was instead regarded as an earnest author by nationalists of the Sămănătorul and Poporanist schools, and acknowledged as a childhood influence by Mihail Sadoveanu and Ion Agârbiceanu. He found some backers on the modernist scene as well, possibly inspiring the early prose of Panait Istrati, and being a childhood favorite of Sașa Pană and Ion Călugăru; the latter went on to copy his writing style, in novels he published under a pseudonym.

Depicting himself as a Poporanist after World War I, Popnedea continued to write into his late seventies—though his final output centered on postal and railways history, rather than fiction. His activities as a clerk were by then also touched by controversy, as he had been accused publicly of not fulfilling his duties, and once investigated for allegedly stealing documents. His boasting about having access to secret information had also seen him caught up in a 1909 investigation centered on an assassination attempt against the Prime Minister, Ion I. C. Brătianu. Popescu's literature still had a large following after his death in 1921, and came to be seen by various posthumous reviewers as superior to other forms of popular literature, produced during the interwar and later on.

== Biography ==
=== Beginnings ===
"Popnedea" was born in Bucharest, capital of Wallachia, to Romanian Orthodox priest Dimitrie Popescu and his wife Niculina. As he noted in a 1905 autobiography, his ancestors on both sides were "plebeian" sharecroppers, situated below the yeomanry (moșneni); he had earlier explained that Dimitrie was a native of Dolj County in Oltenia (Wallachia's western third), and that, through his stories, he gained his first insight into the lives of early-19th-century hajduks. Some two years after his son's birth, Dimitrie became parson of Icoanei Church, in central Bucharest, serving there until 1869. He received another parish in 1875, moving to the outskirts, in Buciumeni, until his death in 1879.

Young Popescu completed his gymnasium-level studies at Gheorghe Lazăr College in Bucharest (which was advanced to capital of the United Principalities in 1859), but moved to Saint Sava for his high-school degree. He left early in 1861 in order to become a civil servant at the Foreign Ministry. His 1900s autobiographies fail to mention his quitting school—they briefly refer to "my career as a clerk" and "my life as a student" as having been equally "tormented". His first published work was a historical novel on Radu the Handsome (Radu al III-lea cel Frumos), appearing in 1864 or 1865. He wrote numerous calendars starting in 1866—when he became a contributor to Calendar pentru Toți, and then to I. C. Fundescu's Calendarul Dracului. The former featured a historical sketch story on the Battle of Rovine, for which he used the signature Nicop. His other work was in political satire, with Bogdan Petriceicu Hasdeu's Satyrul magazine—published in Bucharest from February 1866. This publication was focused on subverting the authoritarian Domnitor, Alexandru Ioan Cuza, and as such required its contributors to hide under various pseudonyms, as Chinese Mandarins on a visit to the Principalities. Popescu himself used the mock-Chinese name "Po-pu-ki", being welcomed by Hasdeu, in April 1866, for his "excellent feuilleton". Over several issues, Popescu contributed Impresiunile unuǐ noŭ sositŭ din China ("The Impressions of a New Arrival from China") and Din viéța amploiațilorŭ ("From the Life of Bureaucrats").

The Satyrul group supported the "monstrous coalition" coup against Cuza, but opposed his replacement with a foreign-born prince, Carol of Hohenzollern. By then, Popnedea was publishing his own almanacs, with various titles; his first contract was with printer Honoriu C. Wartha. As noted by journalist Barbu Brănișteanu, he may have been prompted to begin such work by Carol's enthronement, which he supported; the almanacs double as minute records of Carol's reign, "which is so very rich in great deeds benefiting the Romanian land and its people." Popescu once reported that his motivation for writing was in his commitment to Romanian nationalism, searching for readers who would love "Romanian books on Romanian topics, as written down by a Romanian." By his own account, he was an affiliate of the national-liberal clubs since 1868, and joined the National Liberal Party (PNL) upon its formation in 1875; his private correspondence with party figures, including Dimitrie Sturdza and Ioan Bianu, clarifies that he viewed himself as a propagandist of the PNL, specifically by attacking the Conservatives.

Popnedea was also exploiting the standard ballads of Romanian folklore, with a novella inspired by Meșterul Manole legends. Appearing in 1869 as Meșterulŭ Manole séŭ zidirea monastireĭ Curtea de Argesiŭ ("Manole the Craftsman of the Erection of Argeș Monastery"), it invented a backstory identifying the character with a Andalusian Master Manoel, arriving in Wallachia as a means to escape the Spanish Inquisition. Looking back on the period in 1976, literary historian Mihai Gafița proposed that, by his very selection of historical fiction as a favorite means of expression, Popnedea was a romantic or neo-romantic, prolonging the movement's echoes down to World War I.

=== Early fame ===
According to the literary critic Vladimir Streinu, Popescu's appeal, like that of contemporary writers such as Petre Ispirescu, was owed to his folkloric roots, at a time when the urban public was encouraged to revisit its rural ancestry. Philologist Ion C. Chițimia sees Popnedea as less accomplished than Ispirescu and Dumitru Stăncescu, since the latter two were interested in authenticity, to the point of preserving in writing the peasants' speech patterns (something which Popnedea generally shunned). Popescu himself contrarily believed that his writing style was shaped by the people's "plain and simple" language. He rejoiced in having liberated historical writing from the "archaic" literary language of ancient chronicles. This claim was reciprocated by his reader, and fellow writer, Ion Pas, who calls his a "language of the people", "unskilled, not overly embroidered".

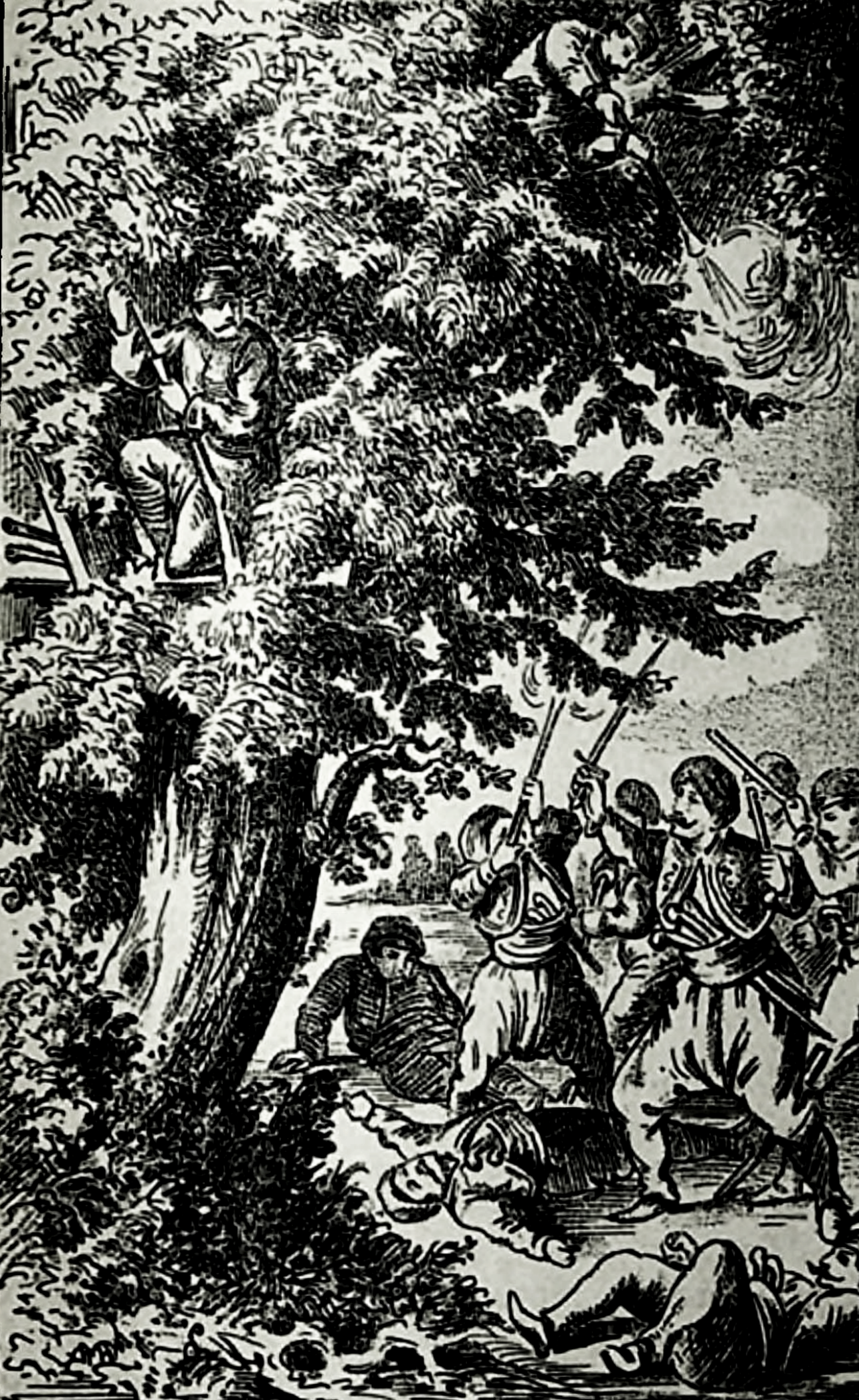
Iancu Jianu's skirmishes with the Arnauts, illustration in Popnedea's 1887 novel Jancu Jianu zapciŭ de plasă

Alongside Meșterulŭ Manole, Popescu released the biography of an Oltenian hajduk leader, Iancu Jianu—the book went through a large number of reprints, with the earliest versions being traceable to 1868 or 1869. Reworking themes from a play by Matei Millo, it similarly implied that Jianu had been a melancholy figure; the content increased "from 50 to 500 pages" in the 1912 edition, with Popnedea adding episodes from his own imagination (such as depicting Jianu as an accomplished vocalist in the manele genre, or surrounded by female characters of dubious historicity). In one version, the epilogue suggested that Jianu and his mob had only abandoned their tranquil peasant lifestyles by unbearable pressures from the Phanariote oppressor—and that their only wish was to be able to return into their villages, now cleansed of injustice. Other variants of the text imply that Jianu and his henchmen had engaged in the ethnic cleansing of Greeks and Turks, as well as in the exemplary murdering of boyars, while sparing "all that was Romanian, whatever its station in life." Working with incomplete records, he also introduced fabricated episodes, being ultimately responsible for turning Jianu's Serb companion, Nikola Abraš, into a nefarious figure.

In 1872, Popescu turned his attention to Moldavia, with a "long novella" which depicted its 15th-century Prince, Stephen the Great, as a champion of Romanian nationalism. During these early stages of his career, he also delved in sentimental and didactic fiction, which, scholar Alexandru Farcaș notes, was heavily indebted to Pierre Alexis Ponson du Terrail. According to Farcaș, he was exceptionally bad in the genre, and inferior to the likes of George Baronzi; his 1873 novel, Elisa, was centered on a negative portrayal of upper-class men as serial seducer of mahala girls, explicitly warning "daughters of my people" not to engage with "these dangerous Don Juan-types." Czech philologist Jan Urban Jarník, who used the novel in his early efforts to learn Romanian, writes: "As much as I commiserated with poor Elisa, fallen prey to a debauched, heartless young man, I wished to read something that was cleanly Romanian." Upon discovering folkloric samples, with their "amazing beauty", Jarník shunned "Poppescu's rather chequered prose".

In 1874, Popescu himself began publishing as fascicles a collection of Romanian fairy tales (Calendarul Basmelor), which include many prototypes of stories later made famous by the Moldavian Ion Creangă—including elements of "Dănilă Prepeleac" (as Dracul și cana, "The Devil and the Mug") and "The Story of the Pig". Also included in the series, Cheleș împărat ("The Bald Emperor") was analyzed by scholar Nicolae Cartojan as a local retelling of the Erotokritos. Popescu's interest in local historical myths also produced his novella on the semi-legendary life of Banul Mărăcine, published that same year. Popescu's other period contributions include a series of song and couplet collections, in the style of Anton Pann's old anthologies. His various articles were carried by various dailies, weeklies and monthlies appearing during his decades-long activity—Amiculu Familiei, Columna lui Traianŭ, Revista Contimporană, Revista Literară și Științifică, România Ilustrată, Telegraful, Ghimpele, and Vatra.

=== Specialization ===
Motivated by the success of his Jianu biography, Popnedea expanded on this recipe, and soon became specialized in sensationalist adventure novels—either historically themed or codifying traditions surrounding famous hajduks and bandits. A few of his many such works include Miul haiducul; Tunsul haiducul; Codreanu haiducu, and Boierii haiduci. He is widely seen as having invented a new genre in Romanian literature, though his were not the first hajduk novels: in 1855, Constantin Boerescu had produced Aldo și Aminta, which is also the first narrative to describe brigands as noble savages, engaged in preserving the "natural society". While Popescu's own books were built on documents discovered during his work as an archivist, they continued to blend in large doses of his literary fantasy, showing his self-reported debt to Walter Scott and Alexandre Dumas. Accordingly, scholar Roxana Patraș sees Millo and Popnedea as largely responsible for making Jianu into a "national myth". Before their literary interventions, Iancu had been mostly regarded as a "mahala minstrel and philanderer, an arrogant 'rascal', whose motivations for embracing the hajduk life remained sketchy". Tunsul haiducul, which is focused on another Phanariote-era brigand, Ioniță Tunsu, is seen by literary historian Mircea Muthu as characterized by suspense, which "pervades [it] to satiety". In Popnedea's lifetime, more credible ("not at all flattering") memoirs of actual hajduks were still being produced by Ion Ghica, in his letters to Vasile Alecsandri. These report that Jianu was plain-looking, and that Tunsu was a failed deacon. According to Pas, Popnedea went as far as to invent brigands that had never existed.

Researcher Lucreția Pascariu discusses Popnedea as part of a literary boom in genre fiction, when publishing entrepreneurs replaced nationalist intellectuals as the main drivers of book production. Among those who credit Popnedea as the progenitor of hajduk literature, cultural historian Lucian Boia reports that over 100 individual titles being produced by him and his competitors before 1920. As seen by Boia, his particular formula had managed to satisfy both traditionalists, who were attached to the Alexander Romance, and Westernized readers, growing up on The Mysteries of Paris. Similarly, researcher Alexandra Olteanu argues that Popnedea had moved beyond the purely romantic cult of historicism, and had managed to capture the bourgeoisie's attraction toward marginals and rebels (as a function of its democratic, left-wing nationalism). These books "constantly contrasted" their rebel heroes "to the passive peasant, 'who oversees his oxen and his plough', accepting the humiliations [imposed on him by] the landholders".

As early as 1870, fragments of Tunsul haiducul had been made into a play, performed by Iorgu Caragiale's troupe. Three years later, George Bengescu-Dabija had completed a stage version of Radu al III-lea cel Frumos, mixing elements from Popnedea's narrative and consecrated romantic tropes, borrowed from Victor Hugo. Popescu's profile as a hajduk writer was always matched by contributions in standard romantic genres: in 1877, he was again focused on fabricating historical legends, as with the novel Fata dela Cozia ("The Girl of Cozia"). Borrowing heavily from Dimitrie Bolintineanu and Alexandru Odobescu in its sentimental intrigue, it was superior to other such works of its age for included documentary aspects, such as ample biographies of Vlad II Dracul and Vlad Călugărul. The mid-1870s marked his own beginnings as a dramatist, with the medieval-themed fantasy play, Păstorița Carpaților ("Shepherdess of the Carpathians"). It was used in 1877 by the National Theatre Bucharest, with Mihail Pascaly and Constantin Dimitriade appearing in the lead roles.

=== War of Independence ===
Popnedea's literary output, which became more regular after he signed a contract with publisher H. Steinberg, was also informed by the Romanian War of Independence (within the Russo-Turkish War of 1877–1878). This exploration began with the novella Constantin, which has the eponymous hero joining the Romanian Land Forces as a volunteer—and then dying from the wounds in the arms of his love interest, a female nurse. The conflict is also the backdrop to at least eight of his novels, all seen as mediocre by scholars such as Serafim Duicu. In one such story, he retold in prose a narrative poem by Vasile Alecsandri—both works were dedicated to a heroic soldier, Peneș Curcanul. As noted by historian Bogdan Popa, Popnedea "willingly embraced sensationalism"; in one of the core contributions of the series, published in 1879 as Amasoana dela Rachova ("The Amazon at Rachova"), he only depicted an episode of the war in the conclusion of an otherwise conventional romance novel. Literary historian Barbu Lăzăreanu recalls that, as a child, he had been introduced to both literature and history by Popnedea's hajduk- and war-themed works. These also inspired, in him and other youths, a "romantic vision" of life itself.

On a political level, a core theme the war novels was nationalist folklore, establishing a link between the United Principalities removing ties of vassalage to the Ottoman Empire and the long line of Ottoman wars in Europe—specifically, Popescu described modern Romanians as inspired by a medieval hero, Mircea the Elder. Also a primary source (due to his work in the civil service), Popescu left ample documentation on the campaigns. His war-themed monograph, which ran through three separate prints by 1889, offered relevant detail on the Land Forces' preparatory activities in Oltenia. As summarized by historian Ion Pătrașcu, the volume's tone is "dignified and patriotic", partly compensating for its failures as a work of science. It is noted for having been heavily relied on by George Coșbuc, who used it in writing a long series of war-themed poems, as well as his own monograph (which stands as a "near-perfect reproduction" of Popescu's). As pointed out by historian Alexandru Duțu, there is a qualitative difference between the source material and Coșbuc's updates: these are entirely purged of Popnedea's "conventional phrasing".

Some of the semi-fictional accounts, for instance the 1879 novella Duoi frați ("Two Brothers"), include ample criticism of the Russian Empire, seen as having betrayed Romania, and propose that the small states of Eastern Europe needed to form a specifically anti-Russian coalition (defining the defense against Russian imperialism as matter or "life or death"). Popnedea remained an anti-Russian into the 1880s, when he was working on a romanticized biography of Nicholas Mavrogenes. As he put it, the topic had attracted him because Mavrogenes was "a man of the people, a lover of the people, and a hater of the Russians [and of the] boyars, who are tools [of the Russians]". Popescu's subsequent almanacs also cover the establishment of a Romanian Kingdom, with Carol as King; in January 1882, the latter awarded Popescu a Bene Merenti medal, Second Class, "for his writings, the folk-historic novellas."

=== Rejection ===
Though his "quite delirious sensationalism" had serious imitators, such as the younger novelists Panait Macri and Ilie Ighel-Deleanu, Popescu was aware that the "Romanian literati" would not have him join their circles. Writing about himself in the third-person, he complained that professional societies did not seek him out, "not even so as to line him up with the smallest of the small-game authors." As Pas reports, his volumes were never sold in high-end bookshops, though this was an unexpected blessing: the hajduk literature never lingered on any shelves, it was instead instantly sold-out, then circulated freely between its intended readers. The Popnedea corpus was indeed strongly disliked and mocked by some of the more elitist authors—one example was Dumitru Laurian; his 1873 Califatul, mixing political satire and science-fiction tropes, mockingly referred to Popnedea as a Romanian classic, whose nationalist work is trampled upon by an Islamic state of the future. Iorgu's nephew, Ion Luca Caragiale, had by then debuted in the theatrical world as a scribe, whose first preserved manuscript is a copy of his uncle's Tunsu play. Later, he was a prompt for the stage production of Păstorița. His familiarity with Popescu's works quickly turned into hostility: as early as 1874, he dedicated Popnedea one of his satirical pieces, proposing that his rival's bust, "in its natural lard", be set on a pedestal decorated with gilded astrological signs and with a cardboard calendar in front of it.

In March 1878, the neo-romantic poet Alexandru Macedonski gave a lecture on the state of Romanian letters. His overview still included Popnedea on a list of commendable authors, though, as scholar George Munteanu indicates, Macedonski's enumeration had "a sort of hastiness". At a time when the more classical-oriented and Conservative-aligned Junimea movement was beginning its rise, Macedonski seemed aware that most of those on his list were "illustrious nobodies". Appearing late that same year at Junimea, Caragiale's celebrated comedy, A Stormy Night, featured uncredited samples of a romance made popular by Popescu's almanacs; in using such fragments, Caragiale makes a point about his characters' intellectual and sentimental expectations. Caragiale's associate George Ranetti was more lenient toward the novelist, and in 1902 looked back on his activity as "perhaps the most popular author of the Romanian realm." He qualified this statement by suggesting that Popnedea was mainly an author of "delicious" literature for children, adding: "Nowadays we smile as we remember [his] books, and we don't even want to bring up their literary value, and yet we have fond memories of the intense emotions they would once provide us with."

In an 1898 study, Junimist scholar Constantin Litzica panned Popnedea's attempts in the field of folkloristics, after observing that a fairy tale he had collected, Pipelcuța, was the only source on "Saint Tuesday"—roughly analogous to "Saint Friday". According to Litzica, he had no scientific method, and had recorded variants from unreliable informants. Other reviewers from the field note that his personal interventions in the text he narrated make him more of an adapter than a compiler. As once noted by literary historian Silvian Iosifescu, his historical narratives were primarily untrustworthy, "rich in anachronisms". Popescu's biography of Mavrogenes, finally published in one of his almanacs in 1890, was used as a secondary source by French scholar Théodore Blancard, who similarly concluded that Mavrogenes had been a champion of the common man. This verdict was reviewed as anti-scientific by historian Ion Ionașcu, who argued that Popnedea's "carnival prose" and Blancard's own "denaturation of sources" had combined into a form of mystification. Popescu's ambitions as a historian were also taken seriously by Octav-George Lecca, who relied on his research for his own genealogies of local boyardom, published in 1899; this choice was criticized by scholar Ștefan Orășanu of Junimea, according to whom Lecca had forfeited his own credibility.

According to a literary chronicler at Mișcarea newspaper, Popnedea was an "enormous" but unacknowledged influence on the Sămănătorul movement, with Nicolae N. Beldiceanu and Constantin Sandu-Aldea both being in his debt. Muthu observes that, beginning with Ștefan Octavian Iosif, the Sămănătorists were able to rework hajduk themes, taken directly from their folkloric source, into a new aesthetic format, one which dwells on their existential, pensive isolation, and their nostalgic view of life. Sămănătorul's doyen, Nicolae Iorga, had argued in 1890 that Popnedea, with his "terrifying hajduks", and Junimist Duiliu Zamfirescu, with his "fantasizing pessimism", had driven their readers to despair, and had made other writers reluctant to even begin work on novels. He later acknowledged having been impressed as a child by Popescu's almanacs, being yet-oblivious to the "ineptitude of his dialogues [or to] the puerile staging of his historical reconstructions". Iorga proposed that a section of the public could still gather its basic education from them. Overall, he rated them as inferior writings, scrise pe șleau, după putința bietului "romancier popular" ("written without much thought, which is how this 'popular novelist' could manage").

=== Return ===
By 1890, Popnedea had generated admiration among the younger writers, including Brănișteanu (who, by how own admission, would spend his entire monthly allowance on the almanacs) and the Poporanist historical novelist, Mihail Sadoveanu. As literary scholar Ion Rotaru notes, the latter had grown up as a "devourer of books about terrifying hajduks", primarily Popnedea's. Though these were "without much artistic value", they helped cement Sadoveanu's belief in social justice and the right of revolution. A similar following existed among young Romanian nationalists in Austria-Hungary. His adventure novels, alongside fairy-tales retold by Caragiale and similar "books of folk literature", captivated a young Transylvanian raconteur, Ion Agârbiceanu. Both authors helped shape his own approach to literature. A generation later, in the Banat, historian Constantin Daicoviciu grew up reading not just Agârbiceanu's novels, but also Popnedea's smuggled-in "stories of hajduks". He remembered the latter for being "the first literary works that made us simmer with hatred against social injustices". Here, Popnedea was subject to official censorship: in July 1889, Albin Csáky, as the titular Education Minister of Hungary, ordered the confiscation of his song collection, Dorulŭ Românului, arguing that it "incite[s] racial hatred".

Some of Popescu's late output turned to fictionalizing current events, as with the 1895 Gizela, sau drama din str. Sevastopol ("Gizela, or Tragedy on Sevastopol Street"). It discussed a murder-suicide occurring that same year in the family of politician Grigore Sturdza. From 1897, his almanac took the name of Calendar pentru Toți Românii ("A Calendar for All Romanians"), slightly modified in 1898, when he changed publishers, to Calendar pentru Toți Fiii României ("A Calendar for All of Romania's Sons"). In a June 1900 letter to the PNL eminence Dimitrie Sturdza, he explained that he was still reaching for "regular folk", defined as people who would read his almanacs as they went on second-hand sale, at 30 bani apiece. As argued by Popa, he never actually mentioned if the public was pleased with his work, nor if the upper-classes really had no use for his literature; in a 1900 piece, humorist Alceu Urechia suggested that his almanacs were in fact aimed at "the rich". Popnedea (also known as "Nedea Popescu") continued to try his hand as a dramatist, completing and proposing several writings in the genre. His work in the field was only revisited in February 1902, when Păstorița Carpaților was taken up by the National Theatre for its charity shows. As noted at the time by critic Emil Fagure, it contained "lots of spiritual contradictions", but remained "vastly superior to many products by authors who presently demand to be in the spotlight." This new version starred Nicolae Soreanu in a comedic role, as Doctor Frangipani.

Brănișteanu sees all of Popnedea's almanacs as forming a publishing continuum and thus reports that, by 1905, they and the government gazette, Monitorul Oficial, were the only two periodicals that could celebrate a four-decade existence (and therefore also the Carlist monarchy's silver and golden jubilees). However, Popescu himself stated that the publication made him little money (especially since he was forced to pay his printers), and noted having had to mortgage his family homes in Bucharest and Sinaia. The same year, Iorga observed that his popularity had been steadily dropping. A contrasting account was provided in 1969 by the poet and oral historian Sașa Pană, according to whom Popescu's books were wildly popular with young folks (including himself and others of his generation) and peasants, making the author a very prosperous man. Pană suggests that such success "allowed [Popnedea] to put out books on which he lost money." Writing in 1906, the aging author himself expressed gratitude to his core audience, comprising high-school students and University of Bucharest youth, noting that they still held up the "torch of patriotism".

Popescu had climbed in the civil-service hierarchy, and from 1876 had served as head of the Foreign Ministry Archive. He worked directly under his brother-in-law, Ștefan Dumitrescu, noted for his controversial decision of destroying most bull's head stamps in the ministerial collections; realizing their value as collector items, Popnedea retrieved two such items before they could be set on fire. He was working on a ministerial yearbook, which was not published, but which was consulted and used by author Moise N. Pacu in his monograph of Covurlui County (1891). Popescu was still employed at that archive in 1890, when he had also been hired by the Ministry of Internal Affairs to organize its documentary fund. As reported by Lupta daily in October of that year, he was falling behind in this activity, despite collecting a "pretty hefty" monthly salary. In December 1909, he was known as a former clerk of the Foreign Ministry. On December 8, after an assassination attempt on the PNL Prime Minister, Ion I. C. Brătianu, he joined the crowd keeping vigil outside the Brătianu home. Several of those present heard him boast that he had been forewarned about a "great event". This resulted in his being questioned by Romanian Police. He finally appeared as a witness at the trial of Gheorghe Stoenescu-Jelea, the failed assassin, where his deposition "generate[d] laughter."

=== Final years ===
During the Stoenescu-Jelea trial proceedings, Popescu declared himself a pensioner who "takes up writing in his spare time." Reportedly, around 1900 Editura Minerva was preparing to welcome him by publishing a collection of his best work. Pas, who was working as a typographer and courier under contract with that company, now had a chance to visit his childhood idol in his "tiny, old house, located near Icoanei Church." He was somewhat disappointed at discovering that the novelist was a "fat, paunchy old man, dressed in a peasant shirt (this was in the summer) [...]. He looked like a mahala publican, or like some horse trader." Pas was also struck by his cantankerousness, and his keeping company with an "ugly hound" that had been barking throughout his short visit. At that late stage of his career, Popescu was seeking to obtain royalties from Bucura Dumbravă, the author of best-selling hajduk novels, whom he accused of stealing from his work; Dumbravă's reworking of the Jianu narrative had indeed preserved some of Popnedea's literary inventions, such as the manele-singing episode and the wholly negative portrayal of Nikola Abraš.

In July 1911, Popnedea was still registered with the Foreign Ministry, and had been temporarily hired as an expert by the State Archives. This created additional controversy after the Archives' director, Dimitrie Onciul, alleged that he had absconded with "a number of precious documents". An examining magistrate carried out a raid on Popnedea's Bucharest home as he was in Sinaia; only two documents were found, and the authorities were persuaded that he was only using them for studying. Popnedea finally retired completely in 1913. In 1912, Revista Catolică featured his bibliography of the War of Independence. The work included his own polemic with Hungarian nationalism and Austro-Hungarian policies at large; in his review and response, Hungarian archivist Jenő Gagyi noted that Popnedea's text failed to even mention the effects of Russian imperialism on Romania, including the annexation of southern Bessarabia at the end of that war. In October 1915, Popescu was in Iași, researching a book on the 1859 union between Wallachia and Moldavia. This period of his life, coincided with World War I and an increase in nationalism (making territorial demands on Austria-Hungary). During the events leading up to the Romanian declaration of war, the cosmopolitan left-winger Ion Vinea blamed him and his hajduk stories for the emergence of "populist imbecility".

Popescu returned in 1919 with a 150-year calendar. It included another autobiographical record, written on the invitation of a reader, who (as Popnedea proudly noted) had called him "the father of our Poporanist literature". The old man still contributed to literature in interwar Greater Romania—though his main focus was in the institutional history genre, with monographs on the state railway carrier and the Romanian postal services, the latter in collaboration with industrialist M. Stambler. In early 1920, fellow writer Henric Sanielevici created controversy by asking why the Romanian Writers' Society, which "has as its mission not the promotion of talents, but the defense of professional interests", did not yet extend an invitation to Popnedea.

Popescu studied intensely at the Romanian Academy Library, where he rubbed elbows with his one-time avid reader, Lăzăreanu. As the latter recalled in 1924, the novelist struck an unpleasant figure, being vociferous and taking up much space with his excess weight, but also falling asleep and snoring as the others tried to get their work done. Another witness was the then-young literary critic, Perpessicius, who noted that "the obese N. D. Popescu, a benign author of the hajduks, [...] spilled over two chairs". Poet Adrian Maniu, who also chanced upon Popescu at the library, described him as "portly, like a carboy of fine wine", being fascinated by the clash between his "serene soul" and the narratives he had written up to that point, which featured "nooses on which corpses hanged and were devoured by crows, graves that hid Turkish bullion, poison that bubbled, prison-doors screeching, phantoms walking about subterranean ruins, and owls flying about old palace towers".

Both monographs were nearly finished by the time of Popescu's death, which occurred in mid-1921 at his home at General Lahovari (Icoanei) Street 26, Bucharest. According to conflicting sources, the date is either June 8 or June 11, both being some two months short of his 78th birthday. His austere funeral was briefly covered by Viitorul of June 13, which wrongly suggested that he had already turned 78; the same source also reported that he had been a "devoted member" of the PNL. Alexandru Vlahuță's Lamura magazine had a more detailed piece, paying homage to him as a one-man "library of contemporary biographies", and as the modern incarnation of Anton Pann.

== Legacy ==
=== Early echoes and assessments ===
Popnedea endures in cultural memory as the most prolific author of the 1831–1918 interval, with 42 full novels to his name (well ahead of his disciple Panait Macri, with 18), and an incalculable number of contributions to serial literature. In the immediate posterity, Lăzăreanu dedicated him a short biographical sketch, informing his readers that the hajduk novels had their literary and documentary significance. Also then, the avant-garde author Ion Călugăru reinvented himself as the folk storyteller "Ion Popescu, aged 84", and published works of prose that borrowed heavily from Popnedea's hajduk accounts—to the point of reproducing their format (printed "on wrapping paper and with all sorts of typos"). Though completed mainly to provide Călugăru with a steady income, these brochures also tested the readers' credulity by introducing faux ballads which were in fact samples of his surreal humor. Călugăru's fellow writers at Curentul daily were also interested in Popnedea's writings: in 1924, columnist Ion Darie asserted that Popescu had created "a certain kind of literature", which was in lockstep with "the people's taste and competence."

In a 1928 article, novelist Cezar Petrescu expressed nostalgia for Popescu's work, noting that his literary niche had since descended into ribald verse, "useful for defiling the souls of country lads and country girls, under the pretense of the printed word." In his overview, Petrescu also noted that Popnedea had prepared the public taste for the modernist hajduk stories of Panait Istrati, who had ensured them a "European fame". Such claims engendered a posthumous controversy: the Popescu–Istrati analogy was reviewed as untenable by critic Pompiliu Constantinescu, since "the hajduks as elevated in Istrati's prose have nothing from the insipid sensationalism of his popular, and falsely supposed, forerunner". Contrarily, Muthu explains Istrati's debut prose as indebted to Popnedea's, proposing that they both rely on "clichés" and "artistic mediocrity". Although he notes the unintentionally comedic effect of Istrati's hajduk novels, he attributes them a superior quality, for striving to evidence the "lyrical dimension and mythical reconsideration of the outlaw" (traits which he sees as absent in both Popescu and Dumbravă).

Popescu and Stambler's work of postal history had still not been published in 1932—with the exception of one chapter, focusing on post riders and stagecoaches. His novels, meanwhile, continued to be enjoyed and reprinted. Writing in 1930, Maniu expressed sympathy for his "most humble readers", people "who genuinely love the adventure, and who wait with restless impatience for its happy ending." Fata dela Cozia was rediscovered in January 1933 by poet Claudia Millian, who submitted its intrigue for public attention. Also then, theologian Iuliu Scriban assessed that Popnedea's almanacs had a "spiritual glue" that made them interesting to the people at large, and which few of his emulators could hope to compensate for. A 1942 report from Corlate village indicated that, at the height of World War II, peasants were consuming Popnedea's literature, with a reissue of his stories being bought out within hours. In a monograph he published five years later, Dinu Pillat argued that Popnedea and his disciples had managed to erase and replace the Alexander Romance as a "go-to book for the literate folk".

=== Communism and after ===
Shortly after a coup in August 1944, the Romanian Communist Party, legalized, began hosting literary directives in its newspaper, Scînteia, with Călugăru invited in as a columnist. In March 1945, Călugăru defended Popescu, the "famous manufacturer of hajduk books", for being a "man of real taste and actual skill", whose writings were "close to the soul of the people." He contrasted him with Theodor Speranția, whose explored similar themes, but with an added "chauvinistic mentality" and thereby courted the "state bureaucracy". After 1948, Communist Romania's literary class expressed disdain toward the deceased writer. Writing in early 1950, Ioachim Botez recalled that "Nedea Popescu" had produced "typographic tripe", which made him a "great fortune". According to Botez, his most objectionable works included "fairy-tales, pulled out of his sleeve, with zmei, balauri, căpcăuni, and some of those monstrosities they call vâlve." In a 1957 piece analyzing new works of fiction, scholar Alexandru Piru argued that Eugen Barbu's picaresque novel, The Pit, was "something out of N. D. Popescu's bag of tricks", and as such unconvincing prose. Another one of Barbu's books, called Vînzarea de frate ("A Brother's Treason"), was more directly and obviously modeled on Popnedea's story papers.

Himself a celebrated figure of the regime, Sadoveanu still "evoked [N. D. Popescu] with tenderness, and on numerous occasions". In 1962, Caragiale expert Șerban Cioculescu mentioned Popescu as being "presently forgotten"; the exact same phrasing was used by Boia in 1985. Popescu's thematic links with Sadoveanu, his rejection by Caragiale, and his overall didactic qualities were again being explored in the mid-to-late 1960s. In 1965, as Dinu Cocea began filming in Sinaia the historical epic Haiducii, writer Dragoș Nerva argued that the project was dependent on Popnedea's fiction, which thus had a chance of being revisited. In 1968, Petru Vintilă, who was himself a children's author, chided the specialized publishing house, Editura Tineretului, for never having reissued a book by Popescu. As he noted in that piece, Sadoveanu's "enthusiastic appraisals" of the hajduk narratives were enough to guarantee their value. A year later, Dumitru Almaș, who had taken up historical writing for children, acknowledged that Popnedea has invented a hajduk genre, and argued that much of his work was based on documents that he had consulted as an archivist, adding: "but he had no literary talent at all, that poor fella. He was a raconteur and he just put together some stories. And after a while, with the hajduk stories in such demand, he himself became a serial and came to plagiarize himself, story after story."

During the 1970s, literary critic Mihai Ungheanu carried out a posthumous polemic with cultural sociologist Mihai Ralea, who had argued that Romanian literary culture was naturally adverse to novels. As Ungheanu put it at the time, "N. D. Popescu, fondly remembered by some of Romania's greatest writers", had produced an "industry", whose very existence disproved Ralea's claims. Writing in 2013, historian Iulian Marcel Ciubotaru concluded that Popescu was an author "typical for the late 19th century", who "presently generates no interest at all." A 2017 overview by Popa reports that: "'Nedea' Popescu, as he was mockingly known to his contemporaries, had no aspiration toward writing cultured, high literature, of a superior register. The harsh evaluations by his contemporaries, regarding both his work and its readers, have endured as the standard, canonical reading of Nicolae D. Popescu's literary legacy, in modern-day criticism."
