= Old St. George Church =

Orthodox church in Bucharest, Romania

Coordinates: 44°25′51″N 26°06′19″E

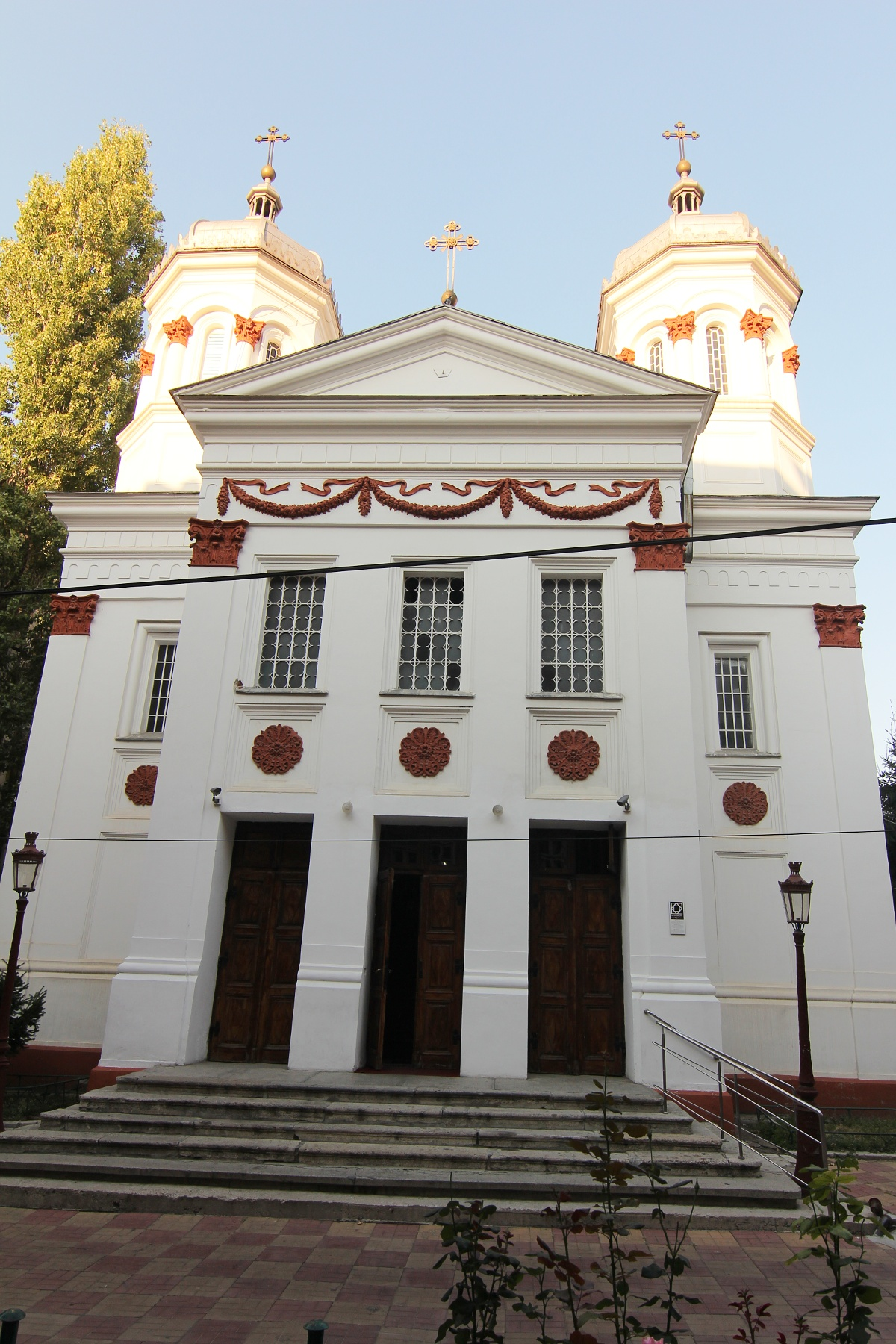
Old St. George Church

The Old St. George Church (Romanian: Biserica Sfântul Gheorghe Vechi) is a Romanian Orthodox church located at 36 Calea Moșilor in Bucharest, Romania. It is dedicated to Saint George.

A monastery was established on the site in 1492, as mentioned in the 1848 pisanie. The nearby foundation of a 16th-century church was excavated in 1954. Tradition holds that the monastery was the seat of the Metropolis of Ungro-Wallachia between 1545 and 1575. The complex was destroyed by Ottoman forces in November 1595, following the Battle of Călugăreni. A 1621 document mentions the imposing bell tower that likely survived until the Great Fire of 1847. Documents of the 1660s and ‘70s mention the church, which burned in 1718 but was rebuilt in 1724. Seriously damaged by the 1802 and 1838 earthquakes, it was finally destroyed by the 1847 Great Fire of Bucharest. Quickly rebuilt by parishioners, it reopened in 1849. The frail structure was demolished in 1875.

The parish council supervised the rebuilding of the church, which was completed in 1881 and consecrated the same year by Calinic Miclescu. Gheorghe Pompilian, inspired by Gheorghe Tattarescu, executed the painting. The iconostasis, carved in sycamore, is in the Ukrainian Baroque style, as is the church itself. Parts of the interior are linden, while the massive entrance door is oak. Renovations were carried out following the 1940 earthquake, in 1964 and in the 1980s and ‘90s.

The cross-shaped church is 32 x 16.9 meters, with the Christ Pantocrator dome reaching 24 meters high. The narthex, typical of the 19th century, is especially large. There is an original crypt under the altar. The structure has walls of 90-100 centimeters thick, on a foundation of cement and brick. The windows are of stained glass. The exterior is simple, the decor consisting of pilasters with neo-Corinthian capitals. A Greek Revival pediment sits above the portico. The domes are characteristically Ukrainian Baroque, but adapted for Romanian preferences.

The church is listed as a historic monument by Romania's Ministry of Culture and Religious Affairs.
