= Ion Catina =

Wallachian poet and journalist

Ion Catina (October 20, 1827 – July 29, 1851) was a Wallachian poet and journalist.

Born in Bucharest, he was the son of Alexe Catina, a Greek coffee vendor. He played the part of a Romantic 1848 revolutionary, Byronic and consumptive. Launched on his career by Ion Heliade Rădulescu and considered a genius by contemporaries such as Constantin D. Aricescu, Alexandru Pelimon and Grigore H. Grandea, he was later rediscovered by Alexandru Macedonski and George Călinescu. The latter dedicated his novella Catina damnatul, the portrait of a Romantic hero, to Catina, while Camil Petrescu included him as a character in his novel about Nicolae Bălcescu. He made his debut as an adolescent in Curierul românesc, with the 1846 volume Poezii. This was followed by the 1847 play Zoe.
