= Scarlat Cantacuzino =

Romanian poet, essayist and diplomat (1974–1949)

Scarlat A. Cantacuzino (June 6, 1874 – August 8, 1949) was a Romanian poet, essayist and diplomat.

== Early life and education ==
Born in Bucharest to the magistrate Adolf Cantacuzino and his wife Ecaterina (née Iarca), he was a scion of the Cantacuzino family, which had an old tradition of political and cultural activity beginning with citations from Roman Imperium, affirming in Byzantine Imperium, European countries and primarily in Romania, with almost continuous citations after 1094. After attending primary school in his native city, he went to high school in Paris, followed by the law faculty of the University of Paris.

== Career ==
Successively an attaché, secretary and adviser at the Romanian embassies in Paris, Brussels, and The Hague, Cantacuzino was Romania's chargé d'affaires in Paris in 1918, at the close of World War I. He returned to Bucharest in 1922, working as a minister plenipotentiary at the Foreign Ministry, while continuing to correspond with other writers.

On an August morning in 1949, during the early Communist regime, he was told he had several hours to vacate his beloved, book-filled house. Toward evening, a little suitcase in hand, the hat-wearing, cane-carrying elderly gentleman made his way to the modest basement room he had rented and lay down. He was found dead the following day.

== Family ==
Cantacuzino married Julietta, the daughter of Basile M. Missir, in 1912. The following year, he dedicated the volume Amour de Juliette to her. Their daughter Armanda was born in Paris on September 1, 1913, and she married Constantin Roco in 1945. She is followed by two children, Mihaela and Mihail, and two grandchildren, Constance Armanda Roco and Charles Roco.

== Poetry and essays ==
A French-language poet who wrote under the name Charles-Adolphe Cantacuzène, he published numerous volumes of poems, essays and studies of literary and art history. He was particularly interested in several important 18th century figures, such as Frederick the Great, the 7th Prince of Ligne and Antoine de Rivarol. His work appeared in Mercure de France, Journal des Débats, Le Figaro and Le Manuscrit Autographe. Attracted by the verses of Stéphane Mallarmé, who became his friend, he published his first volume, Les sourires glacés, at the age of 22 in 1896, upon the latter's recommendation. This and all his subsequent forty-five books were written in French. His poetry, Symbolist in style, was praised by Mallarmé, Paul Valéry and Remy de Gourmont. It shows erudition and delicacy at the same time, as well as a remarkable grasp of the French language's subtleties. The poetic and diplomatic contributions of Charles-Adolphe Cantacuzène have European dimensions.

== Publications ==
- Les sourires glacés, Librairie Académique Perrin, Paris, 1896
- Les douleurs cadettes, Librairie Académique Perrin, Paris, 1897
- Les chimères en danger, Librairie Académique Perrin, Paris 1898
- Cinglons les souvenirs et cinglons les rêves!..., Librairie Académique Perrin, Paris, 1900
- Sonnets en petit deuil, Librairie Académique Perrin, Paris, 1901
- Litanies et petits états d'âme, Librairie Académique Perrin, Paris, 1902
- Remember, Librairie Académique Perrin, Paris, 1903
- Les Grâces inemployées, Librairie Académique Perrin, Paris, 1904
- L'âme de Monsieur de Nion, C.L.G. Veldt, Amsterdam, 1905
- Poussières et falbales, Librairie Académique Perrin, Paris, 1905
- Synthèse attristée de Paris, Librairie Académique Perrin, Paris, 1906
- Les Retrouvailles, Librairie Académique Perrin, Paris, 1908
- Bétises pour Phébé, C.L.G. Veldt, Amsterdam, 1908 (essais)
- Esprit de Charles-Adolphe Cantacuzène, Amsterdam, 1909
- Larmes fouettées, Librairie Académique Perrin, Paris, 1911
- Les adorables coincidences, Librairie Académique Perrin, Paris, 1912
- Amour de Juliette, Librairie Académique Perrin, Paris, 1913
- Apothéoses de météores, Librairie Académique Perrin, Paris, 1913
- A une jolie, Poésie du Prince Ch.-Ad. Cantacuzene, Musique de Suzanne Mesureur. Heugel (Musique notée), 1913.
- Mes Brouillards de roses, Librairie Académique Perrin, Paris, 1914
- La Rose du centenaire, C.L.G. Veldt, La Haye, 1914
- Lettre du Prince Charles-Adolphe Cantacuzène pour commémoration de centenaire de “Mes adieux a Beloeil” du Prince de Ligne. Association des Ecrivains Belges, Bruxelles-Paris-London, 1914
- Hypotyposes, aléas et alinéas, Librairie Académique Perrin, Paris, 1916
- Considerations lyriques: suivies d’inédite adnotations de Rivarol sur son examplaire de Hamboug – 1797. Librairie Académique Perrin, Paris, 1917a
- Mémoires fragmentes de Conseiller de Légation C. Extraits. Librairie Académique Perrin, Paris-Rotterdam, 1917b
- Les Réalitès roses, Librairie Académique Perrin, Paris, 1918
- Parenthèses paresseuses. Librairie Académique Perrin, Paris, 1921
- Charleadolphiana. Librairie Académique Perrin, Paris and Ultrecht, 1921 (essais)
- Extraits piquants et inconues de Fréderic II écrivain francais, avec un coup d’oeil de Charles-Adolphe Cantacuzène, Librairie Académique Perrin – Leyde, 1923
- Précipité de suavité, Librairie Académique Perrin, Paris, Paris, 1925, Imprimeur de l’Académie Royale-Bruxelles-Marcel Hayez
- Poésies dites et inédites du Prince de Ligne, publiés par Eenest Ganay et Charles-Adolphe Cantacuzène. Edition des Annales du Prince de Ligne, Bruxelles, et Librairie Jean Naert, Paris, 1925
- Phosphores mordorés, Librairie Académique Perrin, Paris, Paris, 1926
- Quatorze quarts d’heure avec Monsieur Cantacuzène. Par M.G.C., sécrétaire de legation, Paris, 1926.
- Glyptiques elliptiques, Librairie Académique Perrin, Paris, Paris, 1927
- Identités versicolores, Librairie Académique Perrin, Paris, Paris, 1927
- Les Automnes complémentaires, Librairie Académique Perrin, Paris, 1928
- L'au-delà de l'en deçà, Librairie Académique Perrin, Paris, Paris, 1931
- Essai anthologique, Eclats de conversations, Albert Messein, Collection la Phalange, Paris, Paris, 1932
- Sonnets sans écho, Librairie Académique Perrin, Paris, Paris, 1932
- Prince de Ligne, Mercure de France, Collection des plus belles pages, Paris, 1934
- Frédéric II, Mercure de France, Collection des plus belles pages, Paris, 1935
- Fragments, Albert Messein Editeur, Paris, 1935
- Les plus belles pages de Sénac de Meilhan. Mercure de France, Paris, 1935
- Les dernierés aurores, Librairie Académique Perrin, Paris, 1938
- Nouveaux fragments, Albert Messein Editeur, Paris, 1940 and 1943

== Awards ==
He was awarded the Order of the Star of Romania (1922), the Legion of Honour (1908) from France, Order of Crown (1913) and the Order of Leopold (1922) from Belgium, Order of Crown (1913) from Luxemburg, Order Nichrani-Ifticar (1914) from Turkey, Order of Lion and Sun (1922) from Iran, Order of Santi Maurizio (1931) from Italy, orders from Greece and Benin.
