= Mărcuța Church =

Church in Bucharest, Romania

Coordinates: 44°26′40″N 26°10′21″E

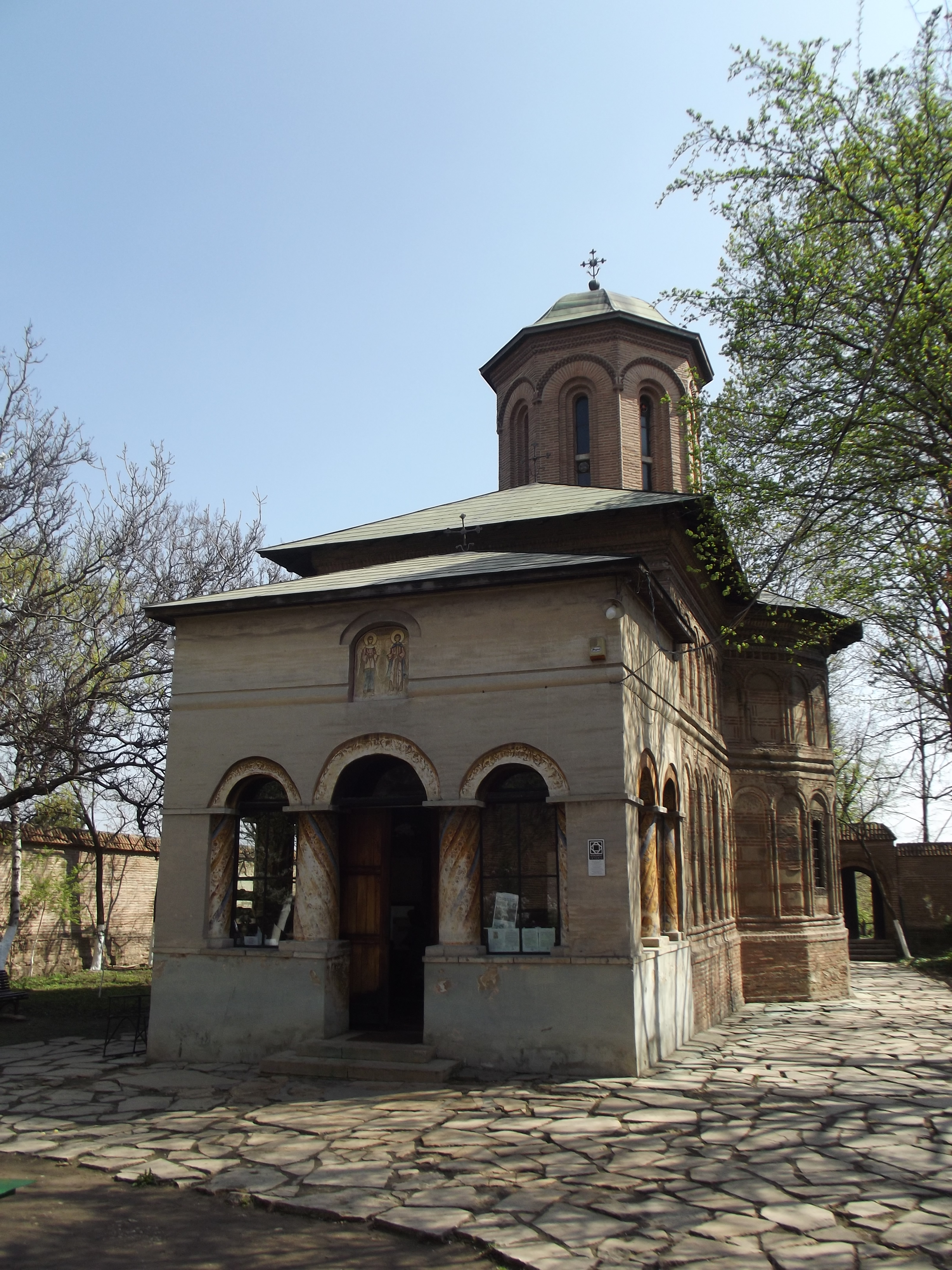
Mărcuța Church front view

Mărcuța Church (Romanian: Biserica Mărcuța) is a Romanian Orthodox church in Bucharest, Romania on the east side of the Pantelimon district. Built in 1587, it is one of the oldest structures still in use today in Romania. In the past the church served the Mărcuța Monastery which was situated on the outskirts of the city.

== Description ==
The construction was started by logofăt Dan in 1586, during the reign of Mihnea Turcitul. Vișana, the daughter of armașul Marcu, later renovated the structure (hence the name "Mărcuța").

In the interior of the old church, paintings on the wall from the 16th century can be observed depicting armașul Marcu. The church was renovated during 1632–1654, 1678–1688 and 1966–1967. Because of its location in a swamp near Lake Fundeni and its heavy fortified walls, the Mărcuța Monastery served as a refuge for the people in the area during enemy invasions.

During the plague in the 19th century it served as a hospital and also as a mass grave. In 1839, the first mental hospital in Wallachia opened at Mărcuța, and it continued to be the country's primary facility of this sort until 1920.

Mihai Eminescu was hospitalized here during his later years of life for a mercury-based treatment.

== Gallery ==
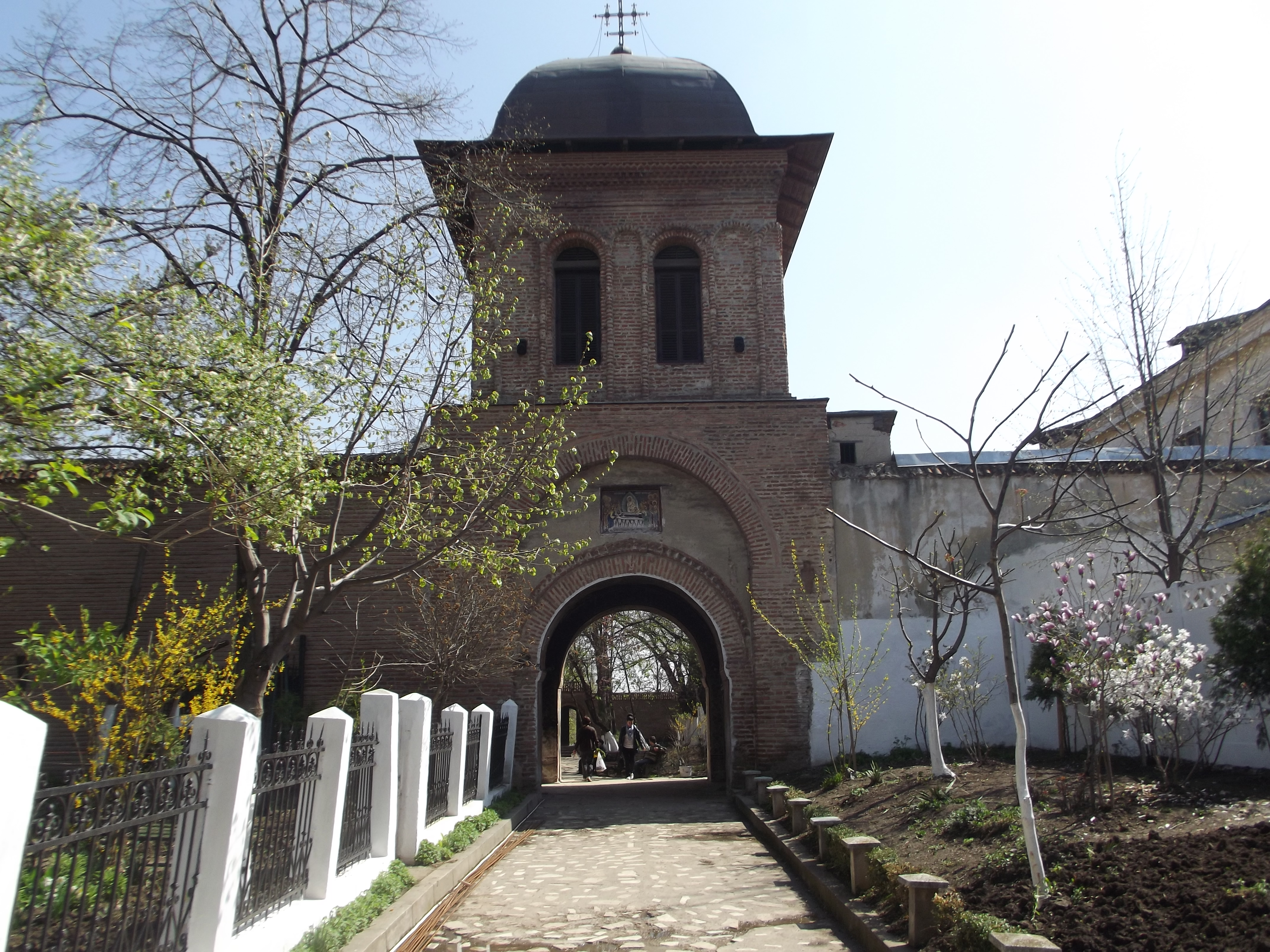
Mărcuța Monastery entrance

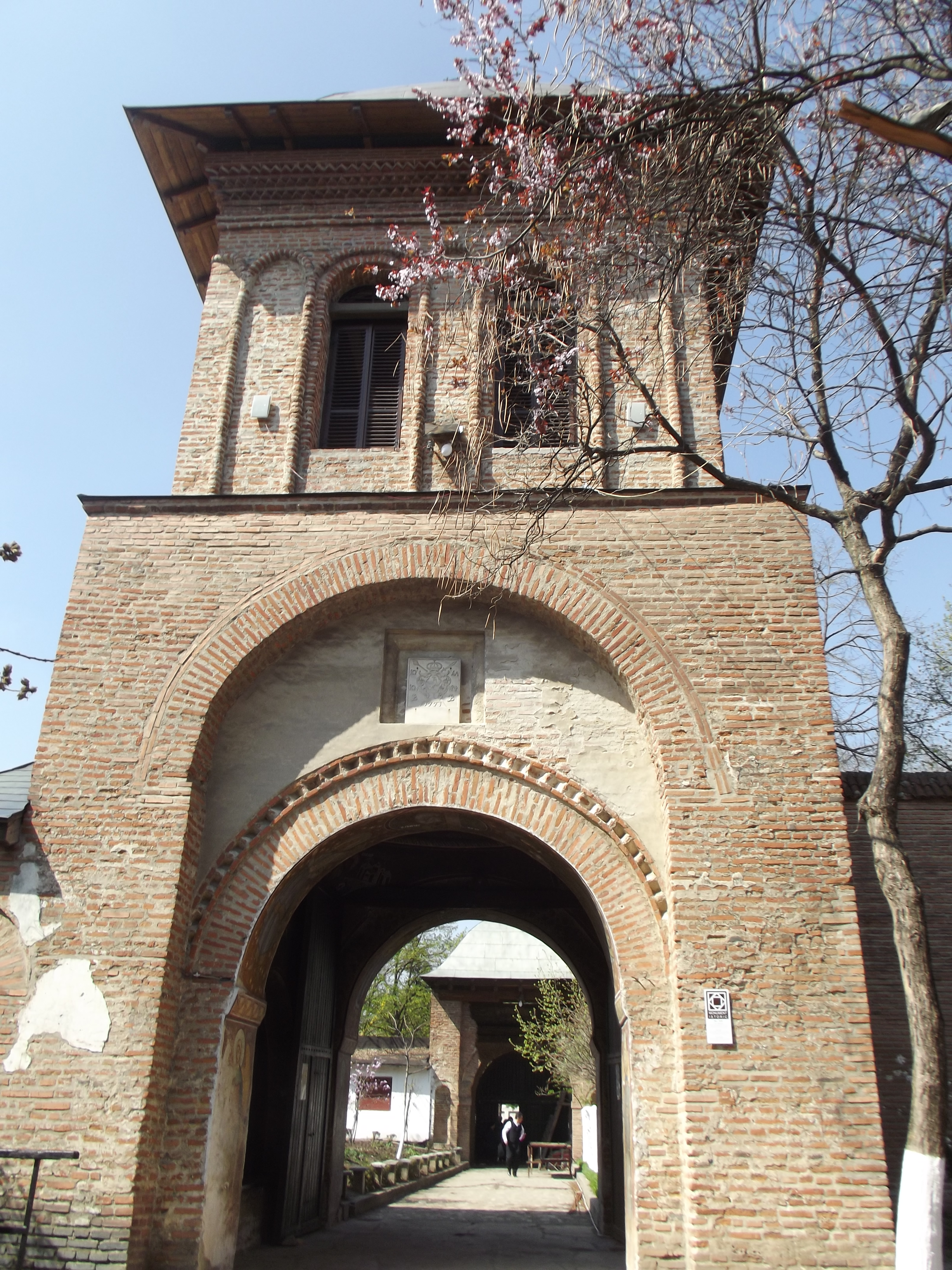
Mărcuța Monastery bell tower

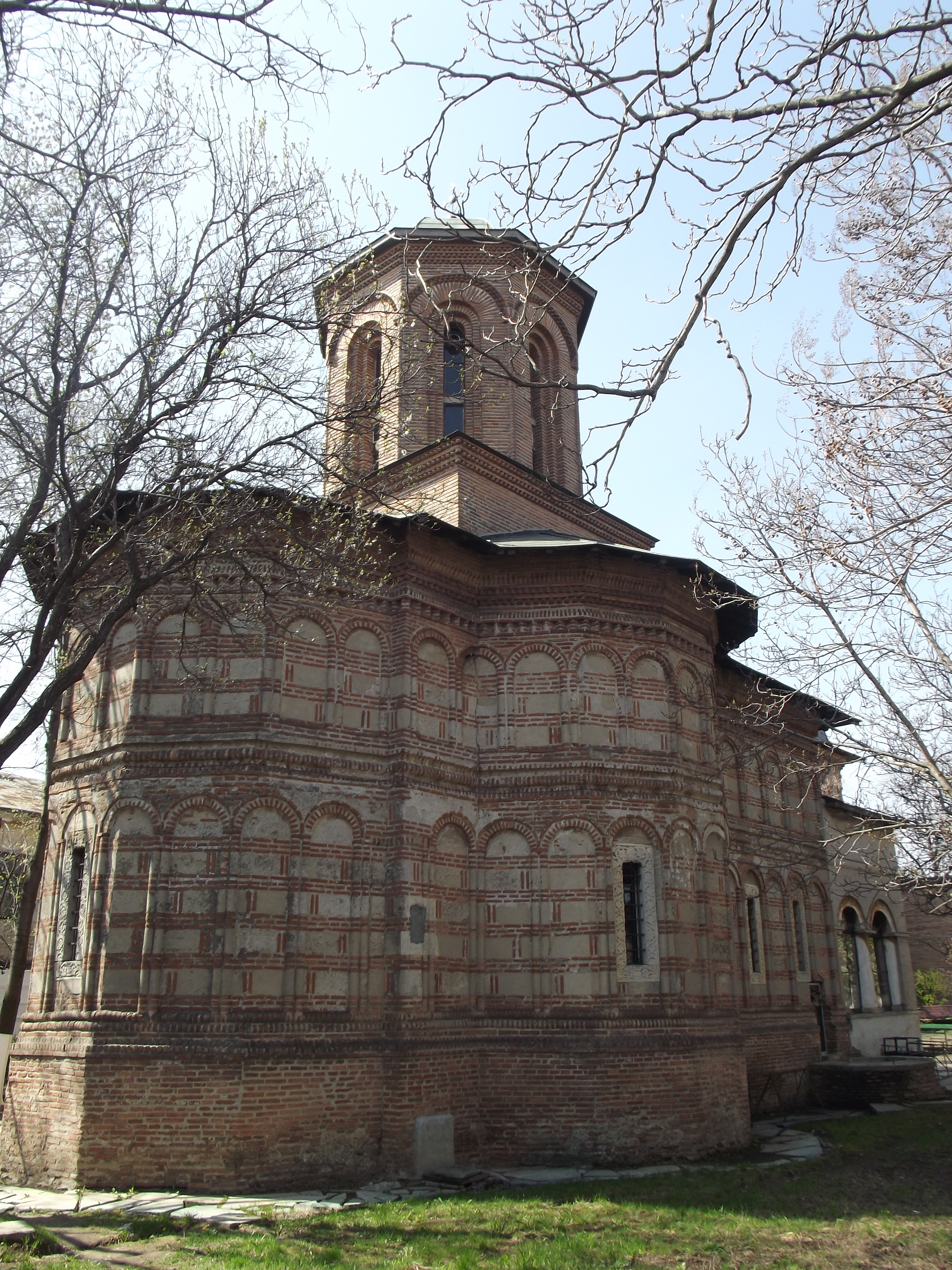
Mărcuța Church back view
