= Ținutul Dunărea de Jos =

Ținutul Dunărea de Jos Ținutul Dunării
- Land (Ținut)
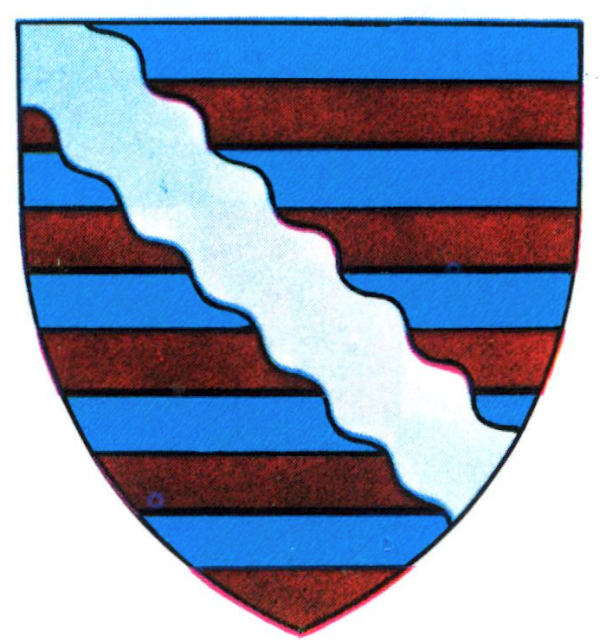
- Coat of arms

- Country: Romania
- Former counties included: Brăila County, Cahul County, Covurlui County, Fălciu County, Ismail County, Putna County, Râmnicu Sărat County, Tecuci County, Tulcea County, Tutova County
- Historic region: Dobruja (parts of Northern Dobruja), Moldavia (parts of Bessarabia, Budjak)
- Capital city (Reședință de ținut): Galați
- Established: 14 August 1938
- Ceased to exist: 22 September 1940

Government
  - Type: Rezident Regal
- Time zone: UTC+2 (EET)
  - Summer (DST): UTC+3 (EEST)

Ținutul Dunărea de Jos (draft version: Ținutul Dunării) was one of the ten Romanian ținuturi ("lands") founded in 1938, after King Carol II initiated an institutional reform by modifying the 1923 Constitution and the law of territorial administration. Named after the Danube River and extending over historical areas of Moldavia (into Moldavia-proper, as well as Budjak and Bessarabia), parts of Northern Dobruja (with the Danube Delta), and an area of Wallachia around Brăila. Its capital was the city of Galați. Ținutul Dunărea de Jos ceased to exist following the Soviet occupation of Bessarabia and northern Bukovina and the king's abdication in 1940.

== Coat of arms ==
The coat of arms consists of ten bars, five of azure and five of murrey, representing the former ten counties (județe) of Greater Romania (71 in total) which it included. Over the bars there is an argent bend, of wavy shape, reminding of the Danube.

== Counties incorporated ==
After the 1938 Administrative and Constitutional Reform, of the older 71 counties, Ținutul Dunărea de Jos included ten:

- Brăila County
- Cahul County
- Covurlui County
- Fălciu County
- Ismail County
- Putna County
- Râmnicu Sărat County
- Tecuci County
- Tulcea County
- Tutova County

== See also ==
- Historical administrative divisions of Romania
- Sud-Est (development region)
- History of Romania
