= Ismail County =

Județul Ismail
- County (Județ)
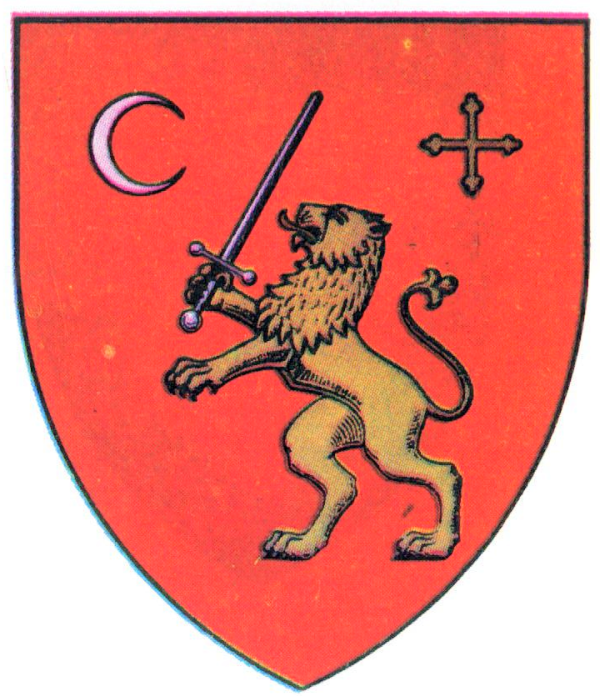
- Coat of arms

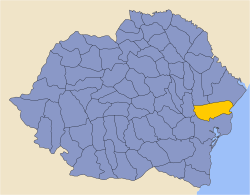
- Country: Romania
- Historic region: Bessarabia
- Capital city (Reședință de județ): Ismail
- Established: 1925 (first time); 1941 (second time)
- Ceased to exist: 1938 (first time); 1944 (second time)

Government
  - Type: Prefect

Area
  - Total: 4,212 km^{2} (1,626 sq mi)

Population (1930)
  - Total: 225,509
  - Density: 53.54/km^{2} (138.7/sq mi)
- Time zone: UTC+2 (EET)
  - Summer (DST): UTC+3 (EEST)

Ismail County was a county (județ) of Romania between 1925 and 1938 and between 1941 and 1944, in Bessarabia, with the capital city at Ismail. It was also a county of Moldavia between 1856 and 1859, and of the Principality of Romania between 1859 and 1878, in Southern Bessarabia.

== Geography ==
The county was located in the eastern part of Greater Romania, in the south of the historical region of Bessarabia, north of the Chilia branch of the Danube.

The county neighboured the counties of Cetatea-Albă and Cahul to the north, Covurlui to the west, Tulcea to the south and the Black Sea to the south-east. Today, the territory of the former county is primarily in Ukraine, with a smaller part in the west belonging to Moldova.

== Administration ==
The county comprised four districts (plăși):

1. Plasa Bolgrad, headquartered at Bolgrad
2. Plasa Chilia Nouă, headquartered at Chilia Nouă
3. Plasa Fântâna Zânelor, headquartered at Fântâna-Zânelor
4. Plasa Reni, headquartered at Reni

There were five cities in the county: Ismail (capital), Bolgrad, Chilia Nouă, Reni, and Vâlcov.

== Population ==
According to the Romanian census of 1930 the population of Ismail County was 225,509, of which 31.9% were ethnic Romanians, 29.7% Russians, 19.2% Bulgarians, 6.9% Gagauz, 4.7% Ukrainians, 2.8% Jews, as well as other minorities. From the religious point of view, the county population consisted of 87.9% Eastern Orthodox, 7.6% Old Rite Orthodox (Lipoveni), 2.9% Jewish, as well as other minorities.

=== Urban population ===
According to the Romanian census of 1930 the urban population of Ismail County was 75,860, of which 44.7% were ethnic Russians, 24.6% Romanians, 12.4% Bulgarians, 8.1% Jews, 5.0% Ukrainians, 0.7% Greeks, as well as other minorities. From the religious point of view, the urban population consisted of 80.7% Eastern Orthodox, 9.3% Old Rite Orthodox (Lipoveni), 8.2% Jewish, 0.7% Roman Catholic, as well as other minorities.

== History ==
At the end of the Crimean War, by the Treaty of Paris (1856), Southern Bessarabia was returned by the Russian Empire to Moldavia. Southern Bessarabia was administratively organized into 2 counties: Cahul and Ismail, and it was part of Moldavia and, after 1859, part of the United Principalities of Moldavia and Wallachia (called Romania after 1866). The Ismail county was split in the 1864 administrative reform, with most of its territory organised into a new Bolgrad county. The rump county remained part of Romania until 1878, when by the Treaty of Berlin (1878) all three counties were ceded back to the Russian Empire in exchange for Northern Dobruja.

After the Union of Bessarabia with Romania in 1918, Ismail County returned to Romania, being formally re-established in 1925.

After the 1938 Administrative and Constitutional Reform, this county merged with the counties of Brăila, Cahul, Covurlui, Fălciu, Putna, Râmnicu Sărat, Tecuci, Tulcea, and Tutova to form Ținutul Dunării.

The county (and the whole of Bessarabia) was occupied by the Soviet Union in 1940 and became part of the Moldavian SSR and the Ukrainian SSR. The area returned to Romanian administration as the Bessarabia Governorate following the Axis invasion of the Soviet Union in July 1941. A military administration was established and the region's Jewish population was either executed on the spot or deported to Transnistria, where further numbers were killed. As the Soviet Union's offensive pushed the Axis powers back, the area again was under Soviet control. On September 12, 1944, Romania signed the Moscow Armistice with the Allies. The Armistice, as well as the subsequent Paris Peace Treaty of 1947, confirmed the Soviet-Romanian border as it was on January 1, 1941. The areas of the county, along with the rest of the Moldavian SSR and the Ukrainian SSR, became part of the independent countries of Moldova and Ukraine, respectively.

== Gallery ==
Ismail County as part of the Principality of Romania (1864–1878)

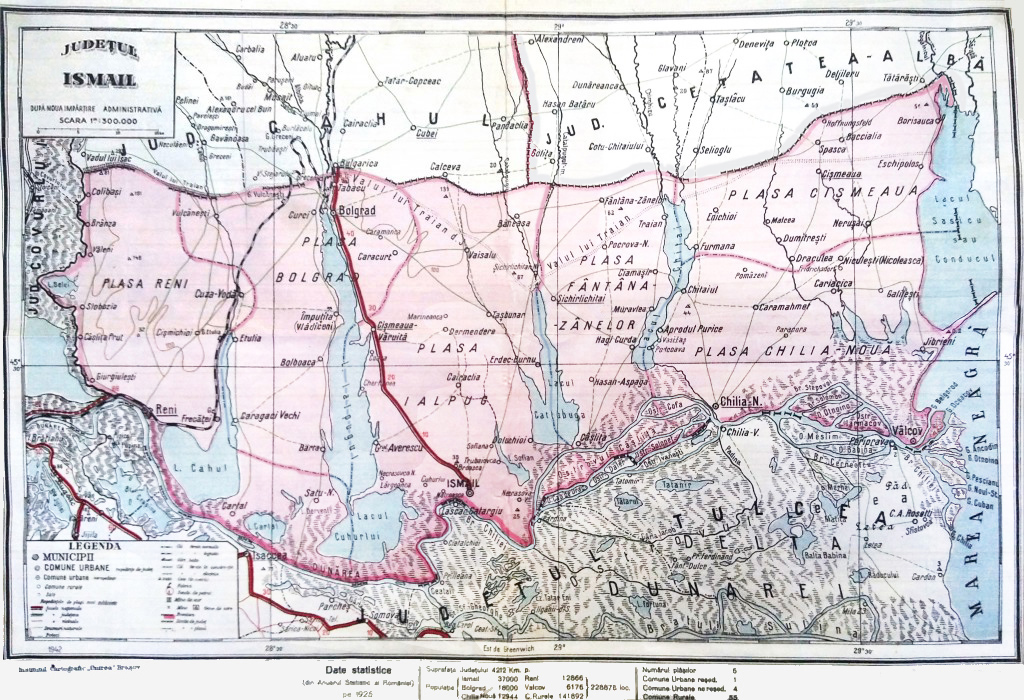
Map of Ismail County as constituted in 1925

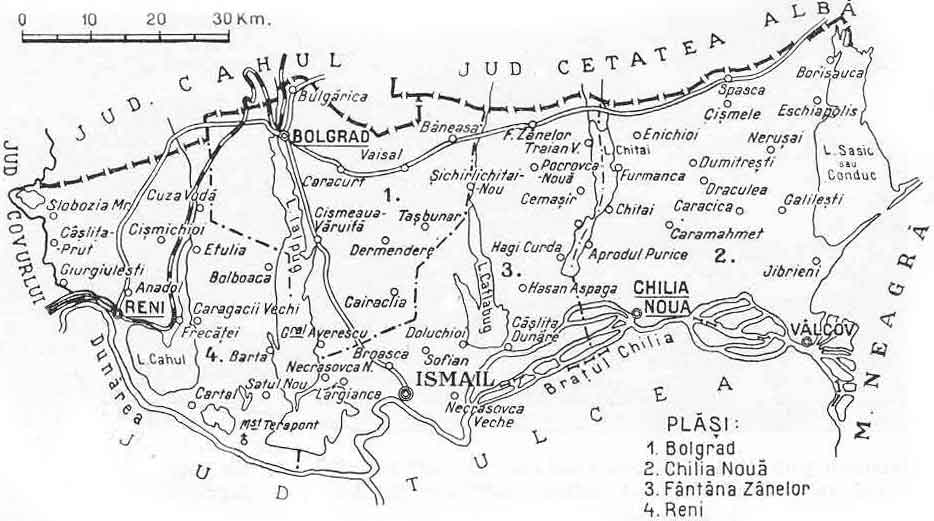
Map of Ismail County as of 1938

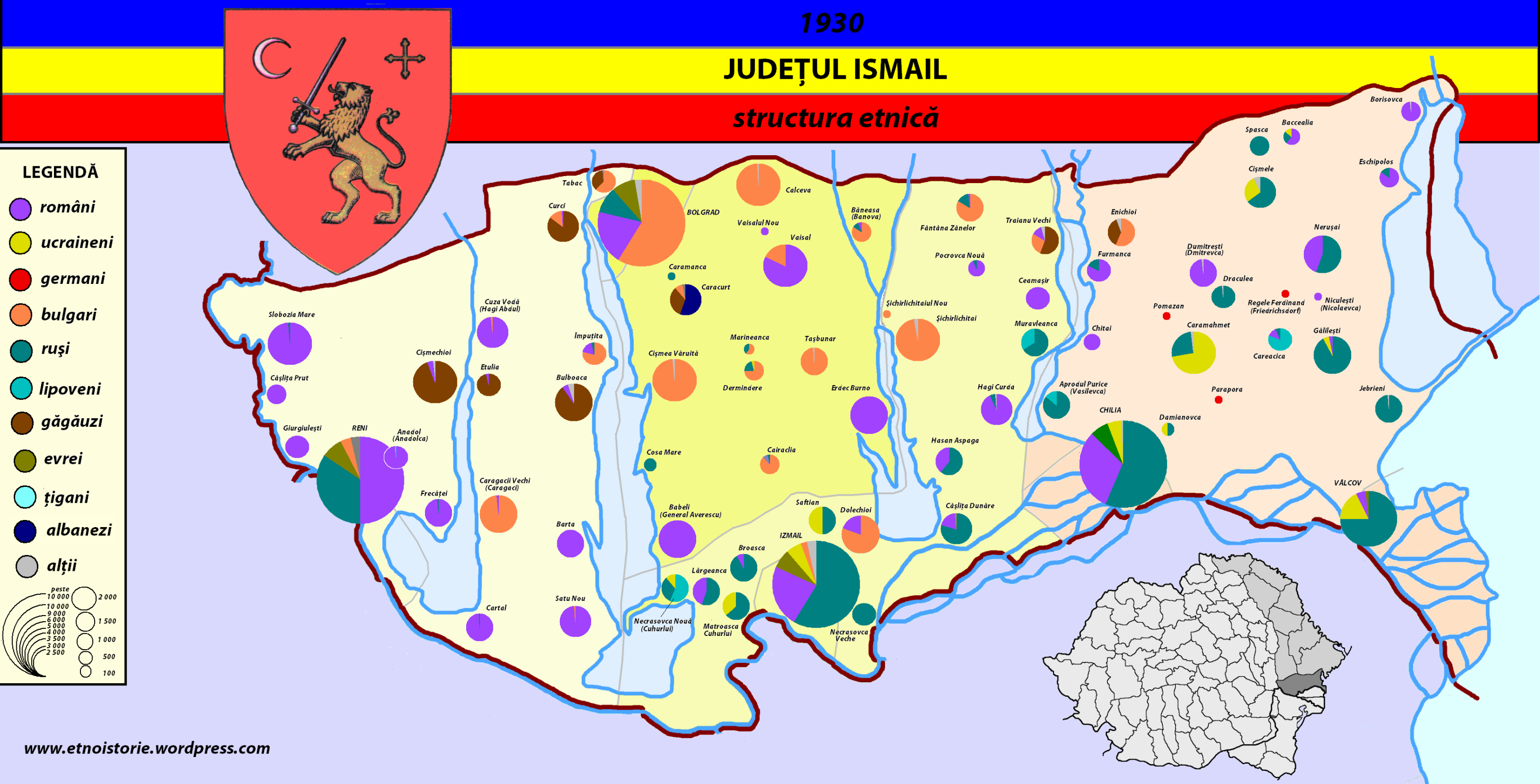
Ethnic map of Ismail County per the 1930 census
