= Gheorghe Vodă =

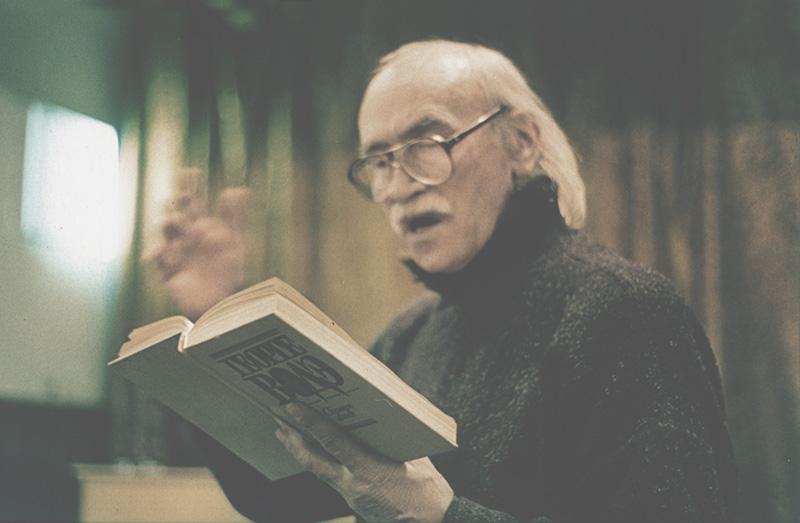
- Born: December 20, 1934; Văleni, Kingdom of Romania
- Died: February 24, 2007 (aged 72); Chişinău, Moldova
- Resting place: Chişinău
- Education: Moldova State University

Gheorghe Vodă (24 December 1934 – 24 February 2007) was a writer, screenwriter and film director from Moldova.

Among the participants of the funeral of the late Gheorghe Vodă were Arcadie Suceveanu, vice president Moldovan Writers' Union, Ion Ungureanu, Vladimir Beşleagă, Anatol Codru, Andrei Vartic, Andrei Strâmbeanu, Mihai Poiată.

== Biography ==
Gheorghe Vodă was born on December 24, 1934, in the village of Văleni, Ismail County (now Cahul district). He studied Philology at the "Ion Creangă" Pedagogical University in Chișinău (1954–1959), and then higher courses of director and scriptwriter at the Gerasimov Institute of Cinematography from Moscow (1964–1966).

After graduating from the faculty, he worked as a journalist and poet. His first volumes of poetry (Flight of seeds, 1962; Autumn Fire, 1965; Hot Rain, 1967; Wings for Manole, 1969) enclose in the resurrectional context of the Bessarabian sixteenth writers, who made the effort to remove the literature from the ideological schemes of time and to impress an aesthetic and national consciousness.

== Death and funeral ==
Gheorghe Vodă died on February 24, 2007, in Chișinău, being buried in the Central Cemetery in Chișinău. He was led on the last road by Bessarabian culture personalities such as: Arcadie Suceveanu, the vice-president of the Moldovan Writers' Union, the former minister of culture Ion Ungureanu, writers Vladimir Beşleagă, Anatol Codru, Andrei Vartic, Andrei Strâmbeanu, Mihai Poiată and others.

== Awards ==
- The Grand Prize for documentary film at the Regional Film Festival in Chişinău (1967) for the film De-ale toamnei;
- Special Jury Prize for Best Comedy and Special Prize for Best Screenplay at the Riga Regional Film Festival (1968, 8th edition) for the film Se caută un paznic.

== Works ==
- Zborul seminţelor (1962)
- Focuri de toamnă (1965)
- Ploaie fierbinte (1967)
- Aripi pentru Manole (1969)
- Pomii dulci (1972)
- Inima alergând (1981)
- De dorul vieţii, de dragul pământului (1983)
- Valurile (1984)
- La capătul vederii (1984)
- Viaţa pe nemâncate (1999)

== Filmography ==
=== Director ===
==== Drama ====
- Bariera (s/m, 1965)
- Se caută un paznic (1967)
- Singur în faţa dragostei (1969)
- Vara ostaşului Dedov (1971)

==== Documentary Films ====
- Amar (1965)
- Chişinău-500 (1966)
- Cu cântecul în ospeţie (1966)
- De-ale toamnei (1966)
- Maria (1969)
- Chişinău, Chişinău (1971)
- Încredere (1973)
- Vară de neuitat (1974)
- Usturici nr.3 (1989)

=== Scenarist ===
- Familia noastră (1962)
- Amar (1965)
- Bariera (s/m, 1965)
- Singur în faţa dragostei (1969)
- Maria (1969)
- Maturitate (1973)
- Încredere (1973)
- Vară de neuitat (1974)
- Usturici nr.12 (1975)
- Jumătate de regat pentru un cal (1983)

== Bibliography ==
- Literatura şi arta Moldovei Encicl. – Vol. 1 – Chişinău, 1985
- Chisinau-enciclopedie, 1997
