= Covurlui County =

Județul Covurlui
- County (Județ)
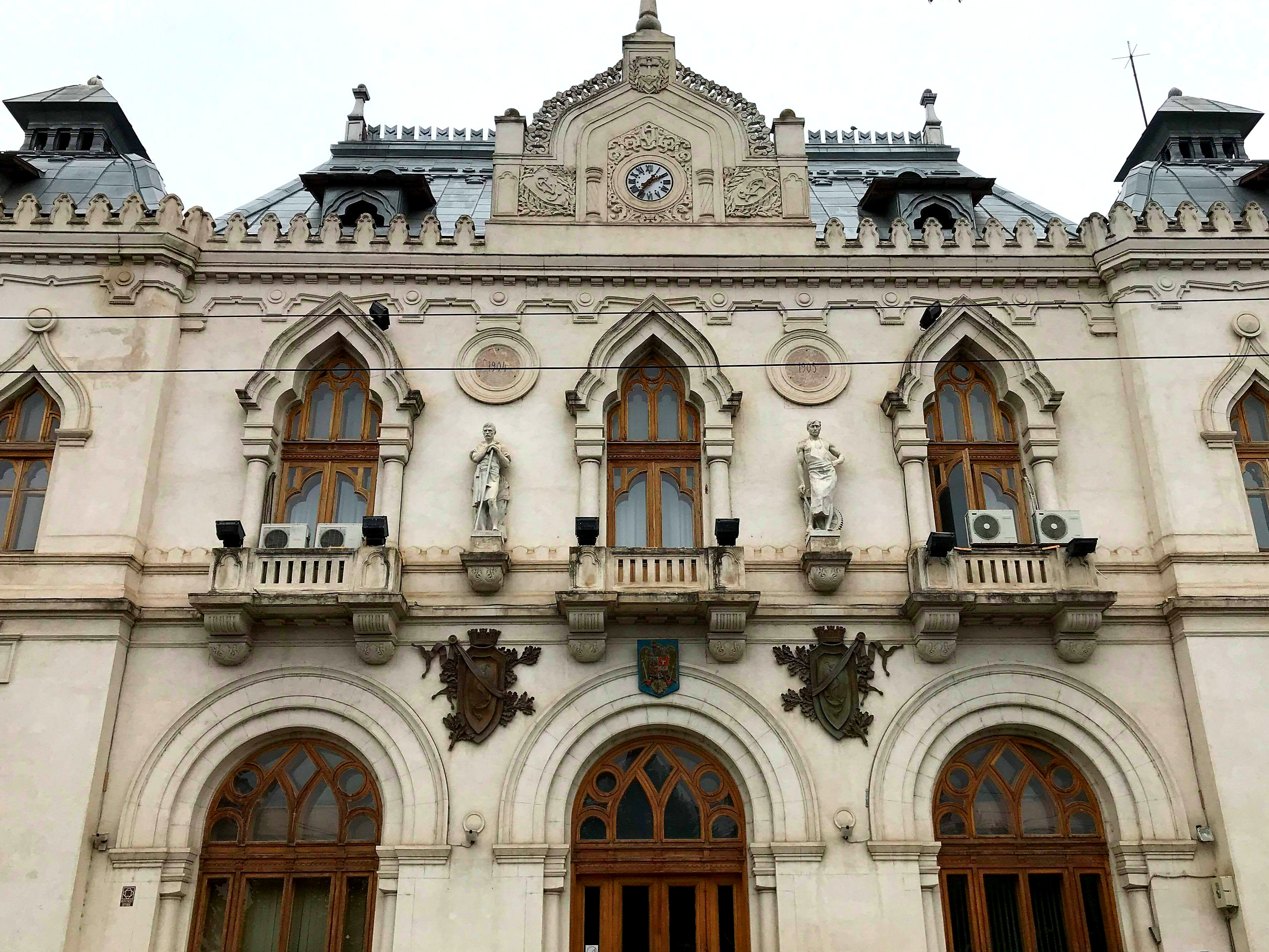
- The Prefecture of Covurlui County Prefect's building from the interwar period

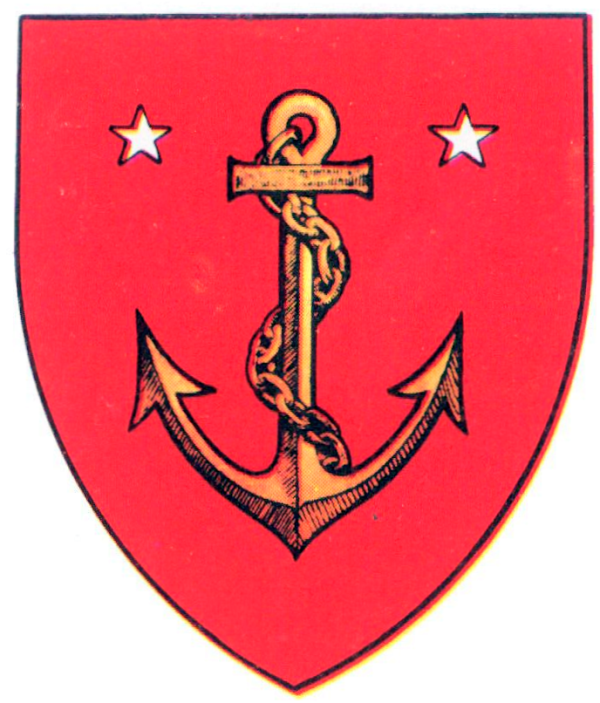
- Coat of arms

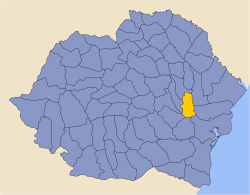
- Country: Romania
- Historic region: Moldavia
- Capital city (Reședință de județ): Galați
- Established: 1925
- Ceased to exist: Administrative reform of 1950

Area
  - Total: 2,662 km^{2} (1,028 sq mi)

Population (1930)
  - Total: 210,006
  - Density: 78.89/km^{2} (204.3/sq mi)
- Time zone: UTC+2 (EET)
  - Summer (DST): UTC+3 (EEST)

Covurlui County is one of the historic counties of Moldavia, Romania. The county seat was Galați.

In 1938, the county was disestablished and incorporated into the newly formed Ținutul Dunării, but it was re-established in 1940 after the fall of Carol II's regime, only to be abolished 10 years later by the Communist regime.

== Geography ==
Covurlui County covered 2,662 km^{2} (1,028 sq mi) and was located in Moldavia. The territory that comprised Covurlui County is now mostly included in Galați County, with a small northern part in Vaslui County. In the interwar period, the county neighbored Tutova County to the north, Cahul and Ismail counties to the east, Tulcea County to the southeast, Brăila County to the south, Râmnicu Sărat County to the southwest, and Tecuci County to the west.

== Administrative organization ==
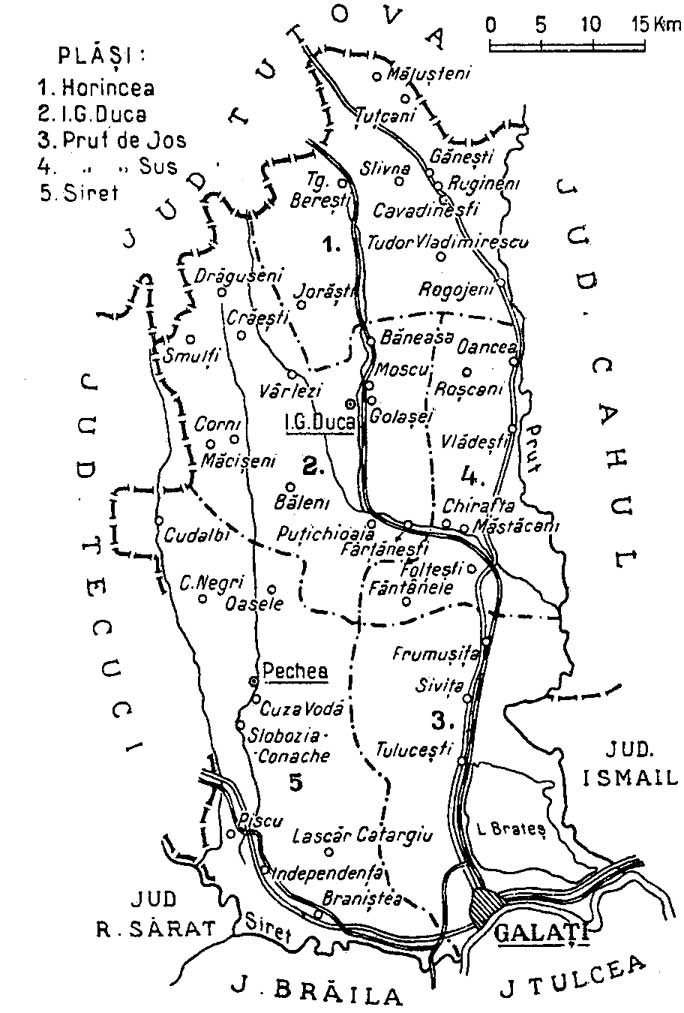
Map of Covurlui County as constituted in 1938.

Administratively, Covurlui County was originally divided into two districts (plăși):

1. Plasa Horincea
2. Plasa Prutul de Jos

Subsequently, three more districts were established, reaching five in total:

3. Plasa I. G. Duca
4. Plasa Prutul de Sus
5. Plasa Siret

=== Population ===
According to the 1930 census data, the county population was 210,006 inhabitants, ethnically comprising 83.7% Romanians, 9.5% Jews, 1.5% Russians, 1.4% Greeks, 1.1% Hungarians, as well as other minorities. From the religious point of view, the population comprised 87.0% Eastern Orthodox, 8% Jewish, 1.9% Roman Catholic, 0.3% Lutheran, 0.2% Reformed, 0.2% Greek Catholic, as well as other minorities.

==== Urban population ====
In 1930, the county's urban population was 101,611 inhabitants, 68.2% Romanians, 19.1% Jews, 2.9% Russians, 2.9% Greeks, 2.1% Hungarians, 1.2% Germans, 0.5 Armenians, as well as other minorities. From the religious point of view, the urban population was composed of 73.9% Eastern Orthodox, 19.8% Jewish, 3.9% Roman Catholic, 0.7% Lutheran, 0.5% Reformed, 0.3% Greek-Catholic, as well as other minorities.
