= Brinza =

Brinza may refer to

- Brînza, a village in Moldova
- Bryndza, a sheep milk cheese made in East-Central Europe
- Ianoș Brînză (born 1998), Moldovan football goalkeeper
- Tiberiu Brînză (born 1968), Romanian rugby union player
