= Southern Bessarabia =

Part of Bessarabia returned to Moldavia and Romania from 1856 to 1878

Southern Bessarabia Basarabia de Sud
- Territory of Moldavia (1856–1859), United Principalities/Romanian United Principalities/Romania (1859–1878)
- 1856–1878
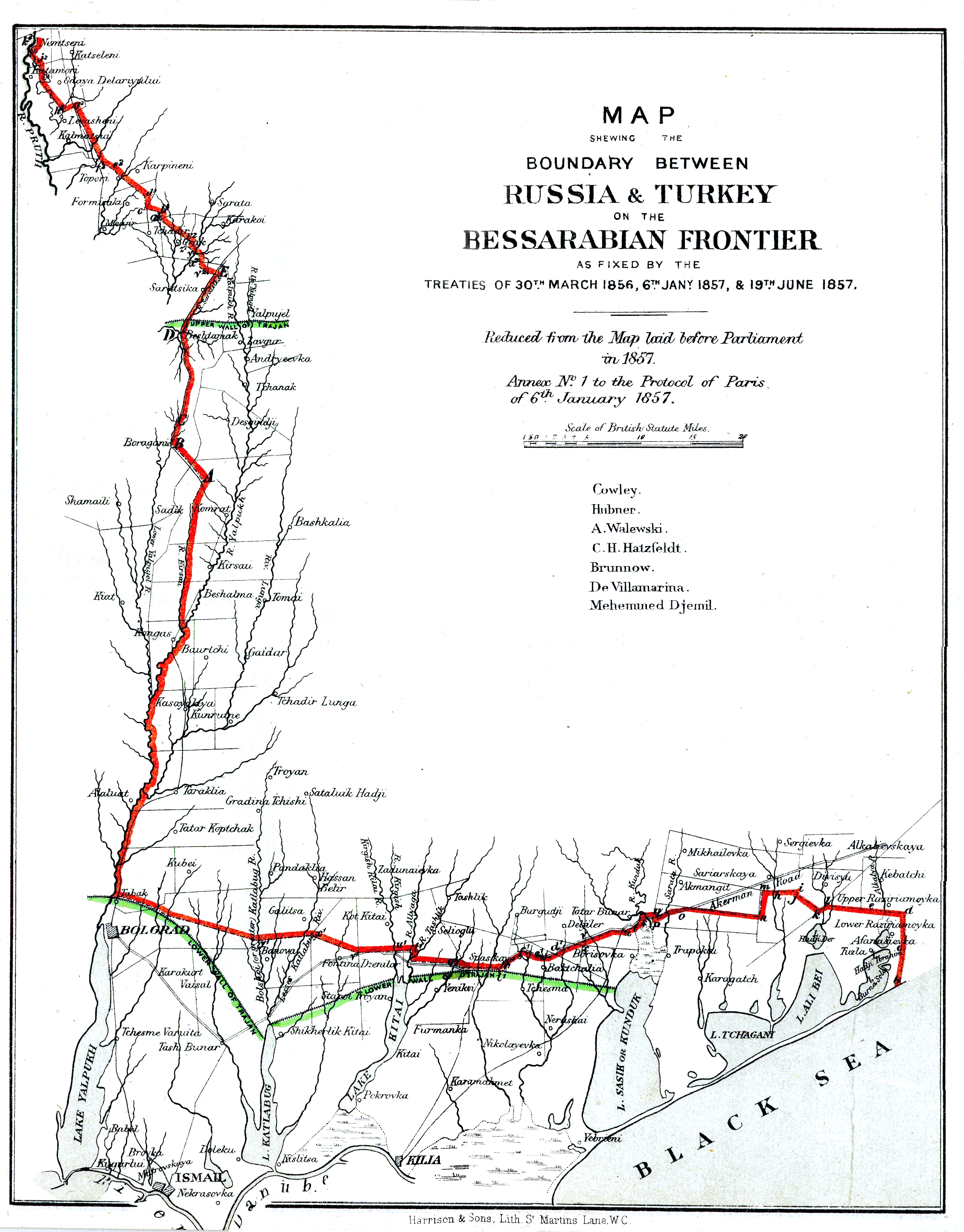
- Southern Bessarabia in 1857
- Area
  - 1859: 8,694 km^{2} (3,357 sq mi)
  - 1878: 8,694 km^{2} (3,357 sq mi)
- Population
  - 1859: 138,521
  - 1878: 163,000
  - Type: Civil administration
- Historical era: 19th century
  - Treaty of Paris (1856): 30 March 1856
  - Union of Moldavia and Wallachia (United Principalities): 24 January 1859 (O.S.) (5 February N.S.)
  - Treaty of Berlin (1878): 13 July 1878
  - Russian takeover: 13–18 October 1878
- Political subdivisions: Counties: Bolgrad County; Cahul County; Ismail County
Preceded by	Succeeded by
Russian Empire	Russian Empire
- Today part of: Moldova; Ukraine

Southern Bessarabia or South Bessarabia (Romanian: Basarabia de Sud) is a territory of Bessarabia which, as a result of the Crimean War, was returned to the Moldavian Principality in 1856. As a result of the unification of the latter with Wallachia, these lands became part of United Principalities of Moldova and Wallachia.

In 1878, despite opposition from Romania, the Berlin Treaty, which followed the Russo-Turkish War (1877–1878), transferred this region back to the Russian Empire (which reintegrated it into the Bessarabia Governorate).

The transfer of the territory took place in October 1878. From 13 to 18 October, Russia took over Southern Bessarabia while the Romanian officials withdrew. In 1918 Southern Bessarabia yet again became part of the Kingdom of Romania for the following 22 years (1918–1940) and again between 1941 and 1944.

== Administrative divisions ==
The area of the region was 8,694 km^{2} (3,357 sq mi) and covered 3 counties:

- Cahul County
- Bolgrad County
- Ismail County

== Gallery ==
Counties of Romania, 1864–1878 (including the 3 counties Cahul, Bolgrad and Ismail)

== See also ==
- Budjak
- Romanian War of Independence
- Administrative divisions of Moldavia
- Administrative divisions of Romania
