= Baimaclia, Cantemir =

Baimaclia
- Commune
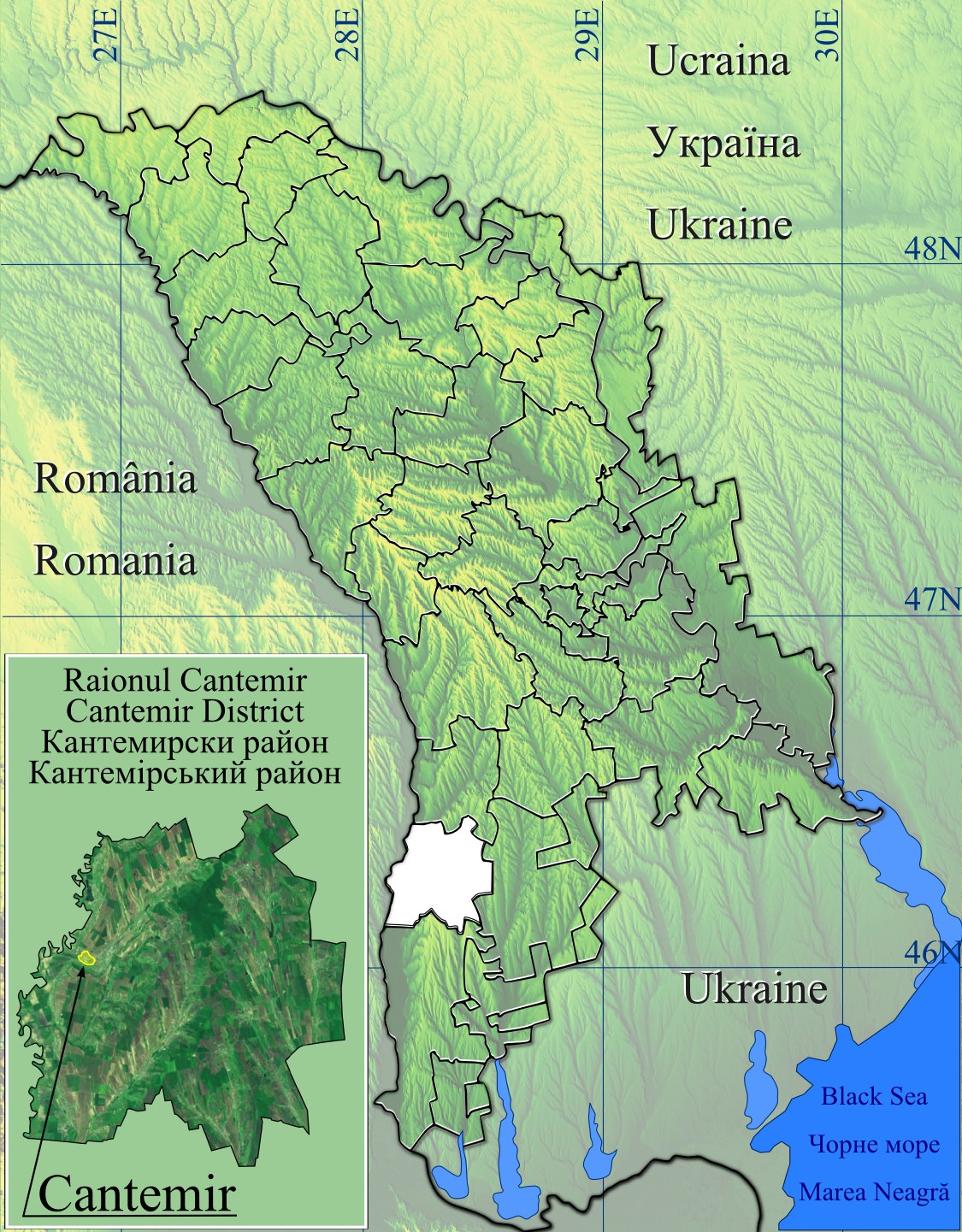
- Location within Cantemir
- Coordinates: 46°11′11″N 28°23′17″E
- Country: Moldova
- District: Baimaclia

Government
  - Mayor
- Elevation: 254 m (833 ft)

Population (2014)
  - Total: 2,649
- Time zone: UTC+2 (EET)
  - Summer (DST): UTC+3 (EEST)
- Postal code: MD-7313

Baimaclia is a commune in Cantemir District, Moldova. It is composed of three villages: Acui, Baimaclia, and Suhat.

During the interwar period, the commune was the seat of Plasa Ștefan cel Mare, in Cahul County, Romania.
