= Burlăceni =

- Commune
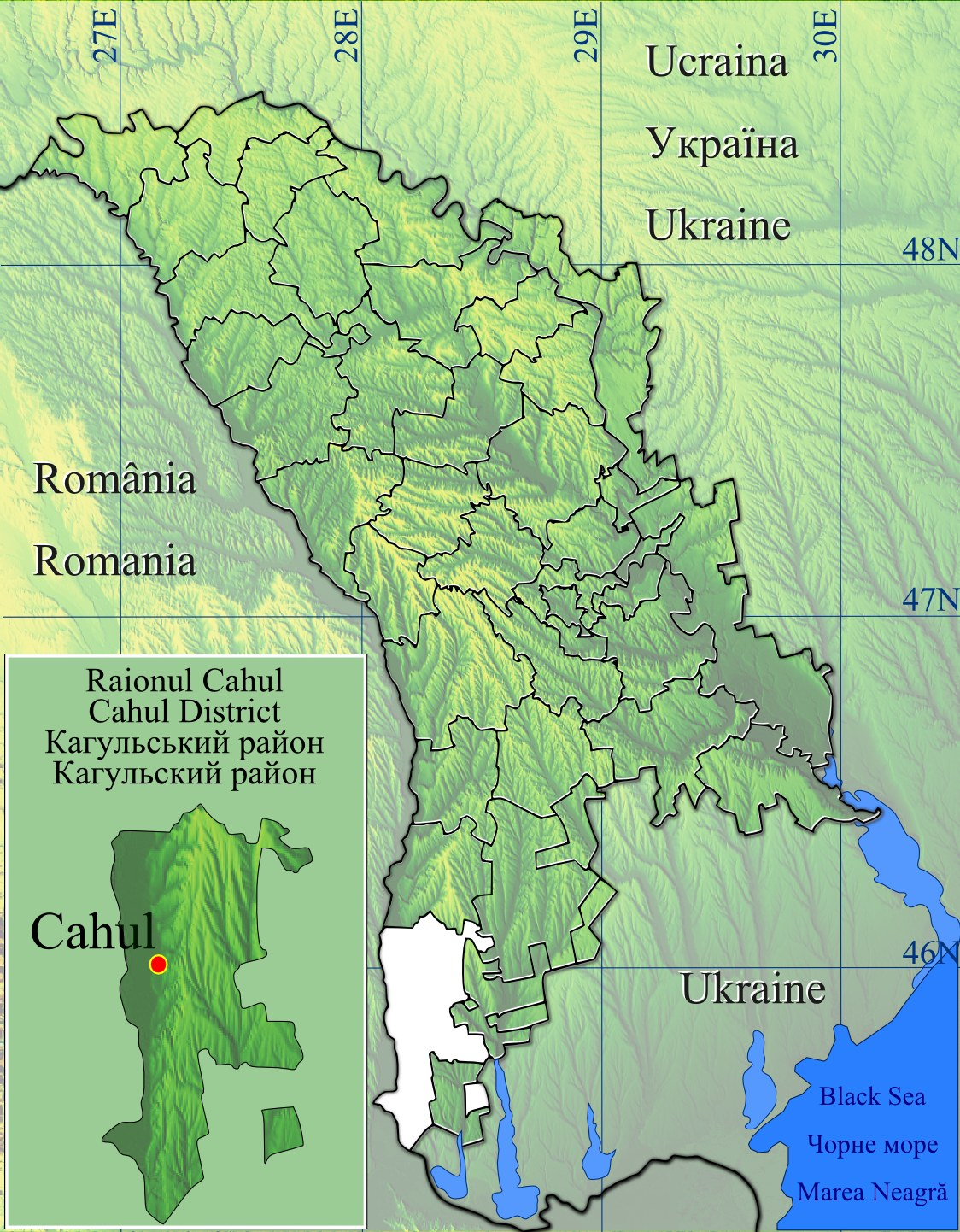
- Location within Cahul
- Coordinates: 45°45′35″N 28°30′19″E
- Country: Moldova
- District: Cahul District

Population (2014)
  - Total: 1,688
- Time zone: UTC+2 (EET)
  - Summer (DST): UTC+3 (EEST)
- Postal code: MD-5313

Burlăceni is a commune in Cahul District, Moldova. It is composed of two villages, Burlăceni and Greceni.

It was established in 1919.
