= Manta, Cahul =

Manta
- Sat
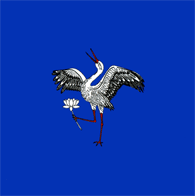
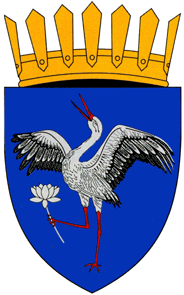
- Flag Coat of arms

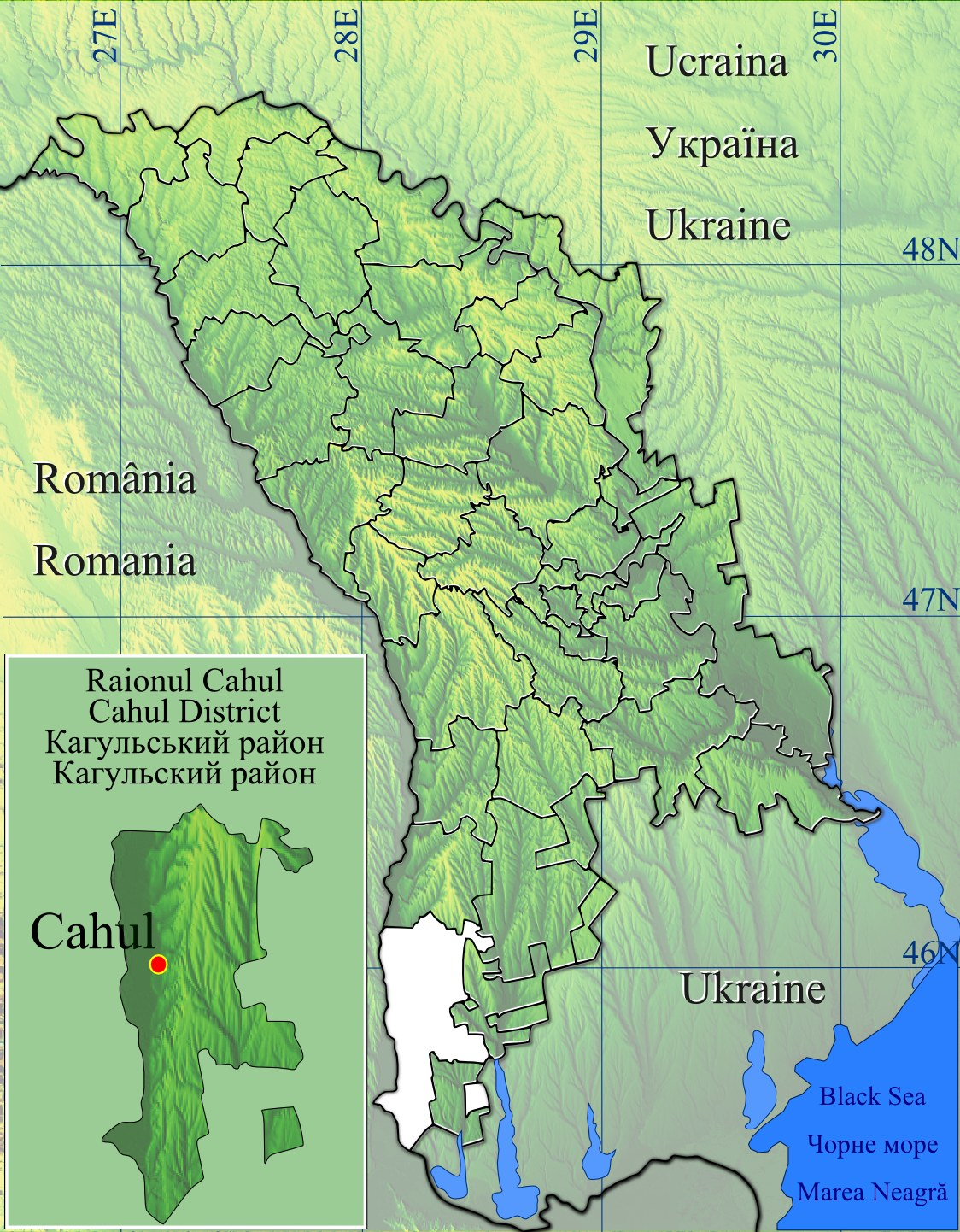
- Location within Cahul
- Coordinates: 45°48′21″N 28°10′54″E
- Country: Moldova
- District: Cahul District

Population (2014)
  - Total: 3,840
- Time zone: UTC+2 (EET)
  - Summer (DST): UTC+3 (EEST)
- Postal code: MD-3925

Manta is a commune in Cahul District, Moldova. It is composed of two villages, Manta and Pașcani.
