= Larga Nouă =

- Commune
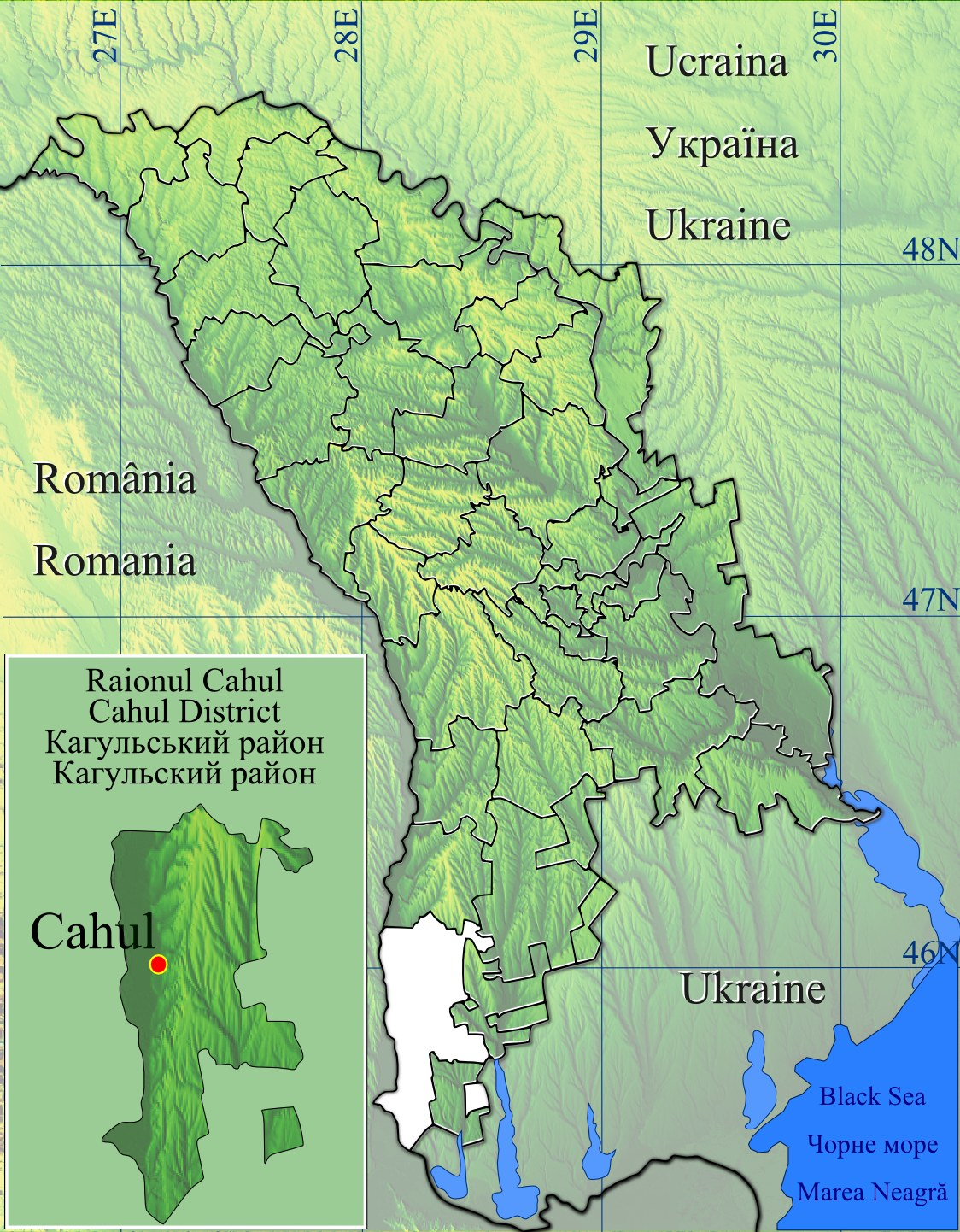
- Location within Cahul
- Coordinates: 46°4′6″N 28°13′13″E
- Country: Moldova
- District: Cahul District

Population (2014)
  - Total: 4,318
- Time zone: UTC+2 (EET)
  - Summer (DST): UTC+3 (EEST)
- Postal code: MD-3921

Larga Nouă is a commune in Cahul District, Moldova. It is composed of two villages, Larga Nouă and Larga Veche.
