= Badicul Moldovenesc =

- Village
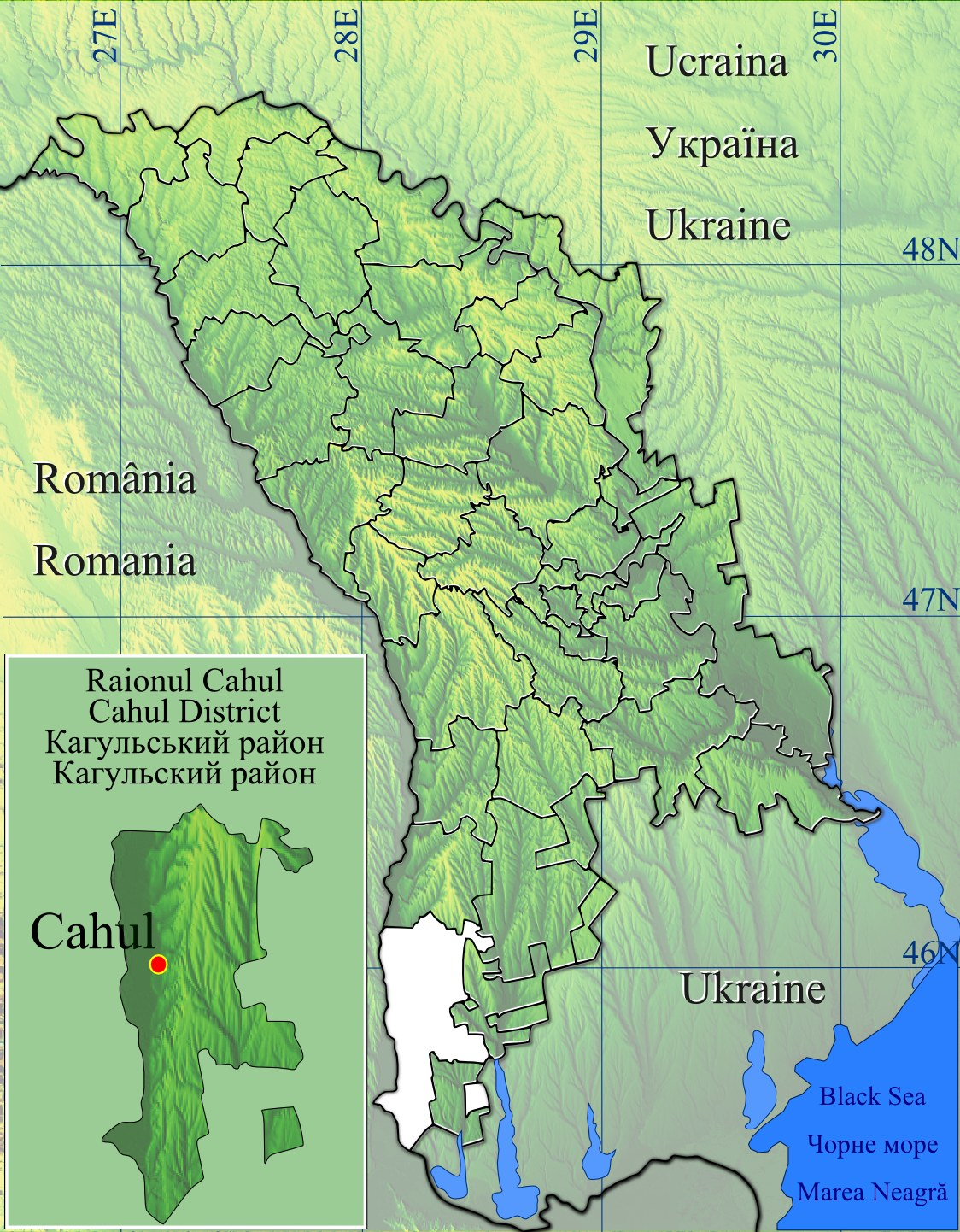
- Location of village within Moldova
- Coordinates: 46°06′N 28°15′E
- Country: Moldova
- District: Cahul District

Area
  - Total: 9.37 sq mi (24.26 km^{2})
- Elevation: 330 ft (100 m)

Population (2014 census)
  - Total: 1,243
  - Density: 132.7/sq mi (51.24/km^{2})
- Time zone: UTC+2 (EET)
  - Summer (DST): UTC+3 (EEST)

Badicul Moldovenesc is a village in Cahul District, Moldova, about 20 km (12 mi) to the north of Cahul.
