= Cahul County =

County of Bessarabia

Coordinates: 45°50′N 28°20′E

Cahul County was a county of Bessarabia. In the Middle Ages, its territory belonged to the Fălciu County, in Moldavia, but after the annexation of Bessarabia by the Russian Empire in 1812, it became a county by itself.

== History ==
Two smaller jurisdictions, specifically Codru County and Greceni County, were merged into Cahul County in 1818. Cahul County was part of the Bessarabia Governorate of the Russian Empire (1812–1856), of the Principality of Moldavia (1856–1859), then of the Principality of Romania (1859–1878). In 1878, it was again annexed by the Russians, who merged it with the Ismail County. After the Union of Bessarabia with Romania in 1918, the county became a first-order administrative division of the Kingdom of Romania as Cahul County of Romania.

The Romanian county was abolished in the 1938 Administrative and Constitutional Reform. In 1940, the area was occupied by the Soviet Union. It was briefly reconstituted as a Romanian county during the 1941 to 1944 Romanian reintegration of Bessarabia as the Bessarabia Governorate, after Operation München, but was returned to the Soviet Union after the Romanian armistice was signed. After the independence, the Republic of Moldova established a Moldovan county of the same name in 1999, but disestablished it in 2003.

== See also ==
- Cahul District
- History of Bessarabia
- Moldavian counties
