= Brînza =

- Village
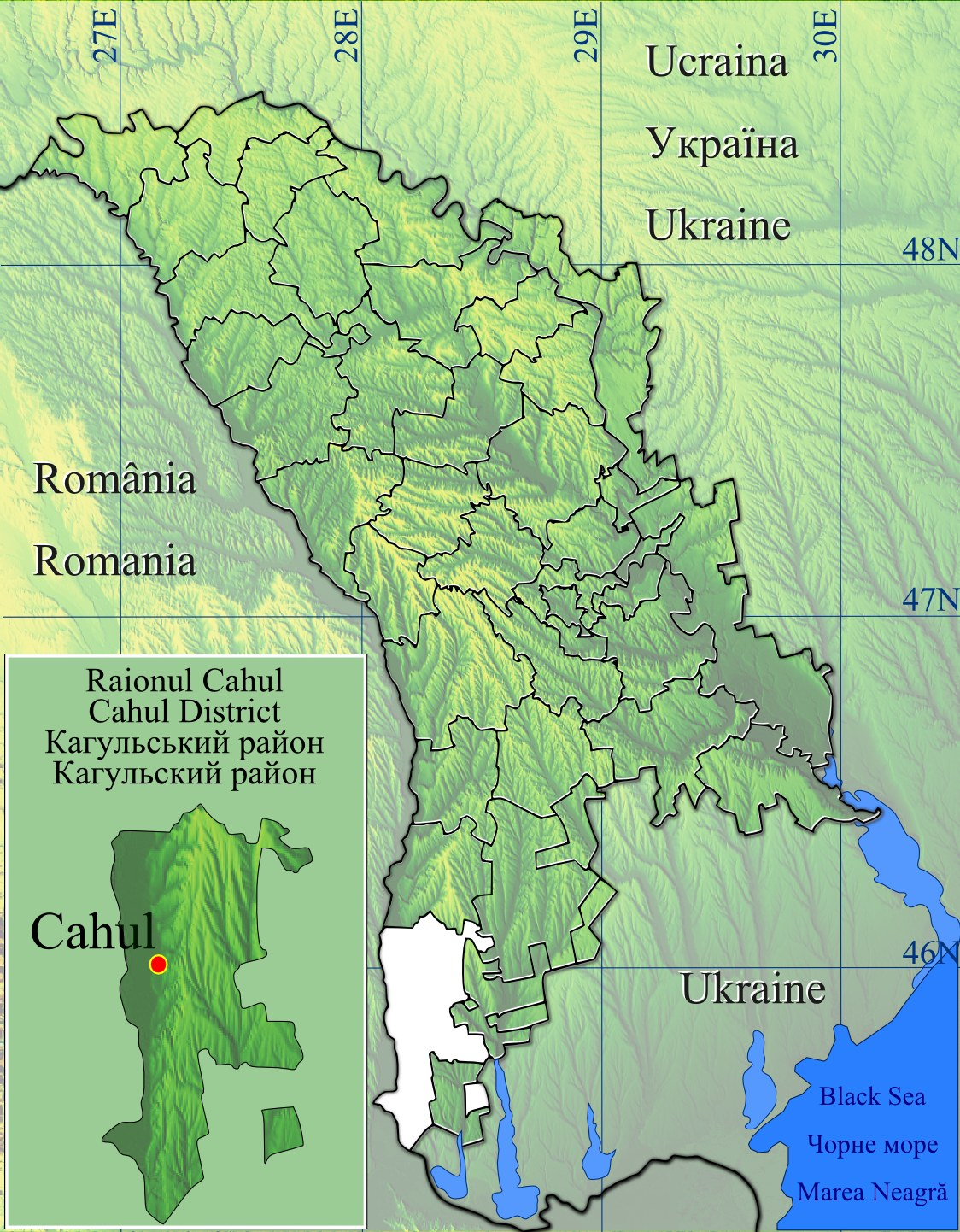
- Location within Cahul
- Coordinates: 45°40′28″N 28°10′35″E
- Country: Moldova
- District: Cahul

Government
  - Mayor: Ion Gavrila (PLDM)

Area
  - Total: 303 km^{2} (117 sq mi)
- Elevation: 15 m (49 ft)

Population (2014 census)
  - Total: 2,128
- Time zone: UTC+2 (EET)
  - Summer (DST): UTC+3 (EEST)
- Postal code: MD-5312

Brînza is a village in Cahul District, Moldova. Brînza village was established in 1630.
