= Tutova County =

Județul Tutova
- County (Județ)
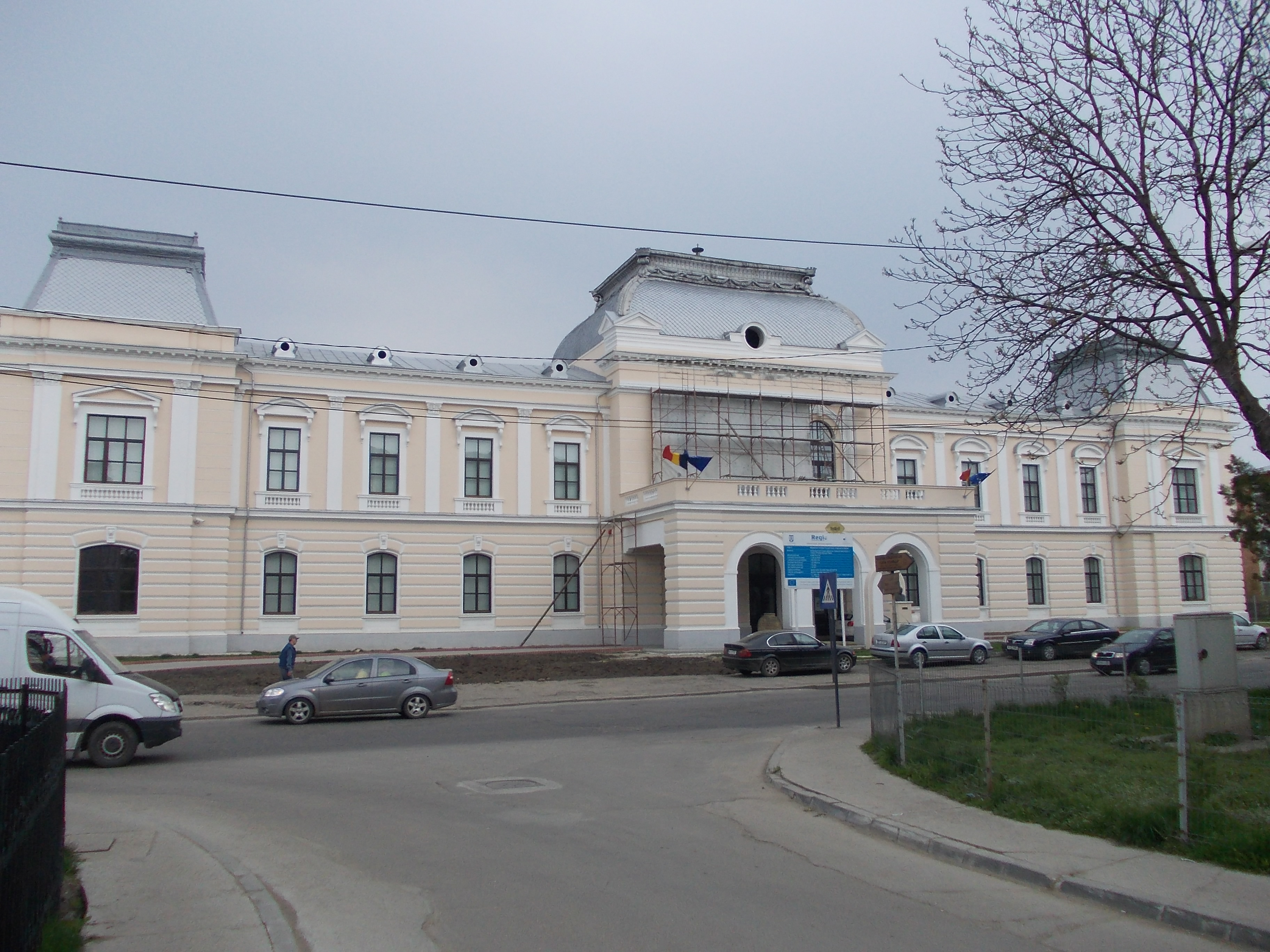
- The Tutova County Prefecture building from the interwar period, now a museum.

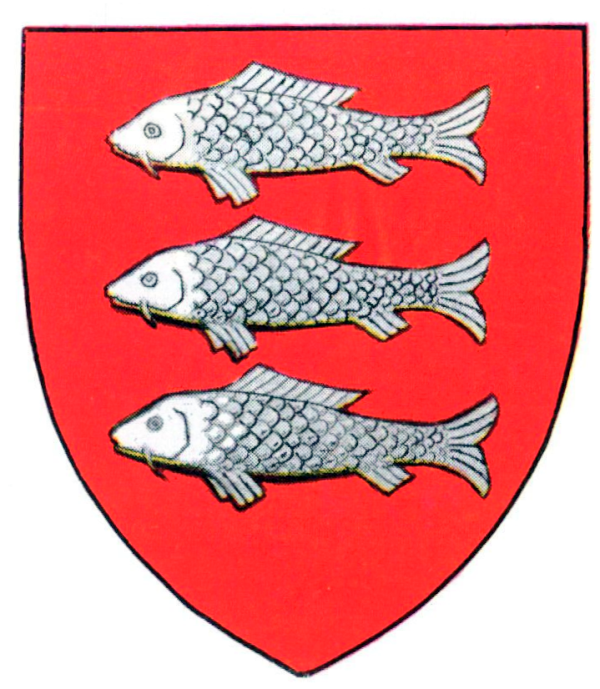
- Coat of arms

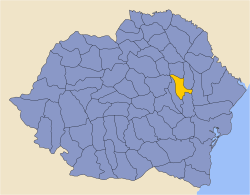
- Country: Romania
- Historic region: Moldavia
- Capital city (Reședință de județ): Bârlad
- Established: 1925
- Ceased to exist: Administrative reform of 1950

Area
  - Total: 2,498 km^{2} (964 sq mi)

Population (1930)
  - Total: 144,821
  - Density: 57.97/km^{2} (150.2/sq mi)
- Time zone: UTC+2 (EET)
  - Summer (DST): UTC+3 (EEST)

Tutova County is one of the historic counties of Moldavia, Romania with the city of Bârlad as capital.

== Geography ==
Tutova County covered 2,498 km^{2} and was located in the central-eastern part of Greater Romania, in the south-eastern part of Moldavia. Currently, the territory that comprised Tutova County is now included primarily at present in Vaslui County, with some of its southern portions in Bacău County and Galați County. In the interwar period, the county neighbored Vaslui County to the north, Fălciu County to the northeast, Cahul County to the east, Covurlui County to the south, and Tecuci and Bacău counties to the west.

== Administrative organization ==
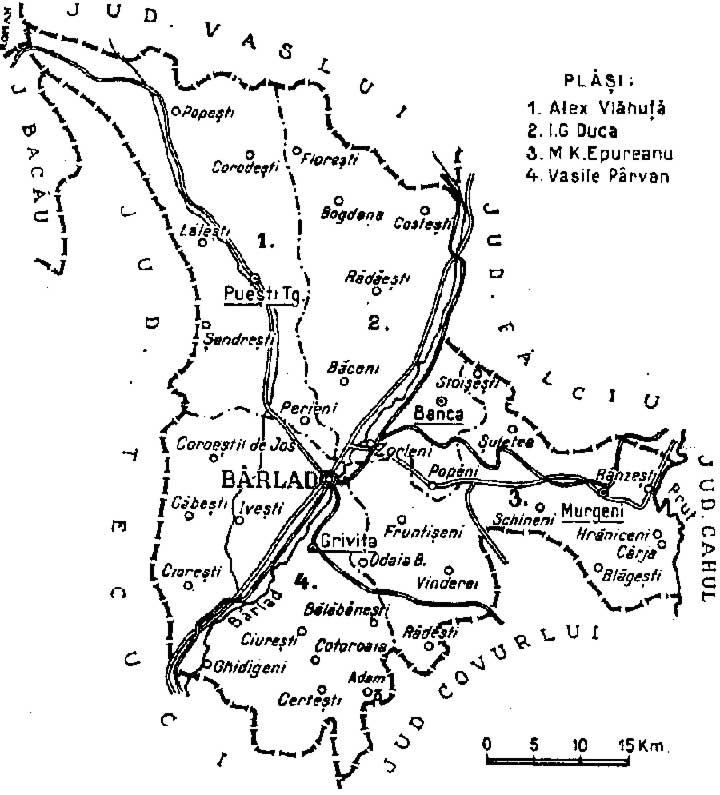
Map of Tutova County as constituted in 1938.

Administratively, Tutova County was initially divided into three districts (plăși):

1. Plasa Alexandru Vlahuță, headquartered at Puiești
2. Plasa Monolache Epureanu, headquartered at Murgeni
3. Plasa Vasile Pârvan, headquartered at Grivița

Subsequently, after a reorganization, a fourth district was established:

4. Plasa I.G. Duca, headquartered at Banca

== Population ==
According to the census data of 1930, the county had a population of 144,821, 93.7% Romanians, 2.9% Jews, 2.6% Romanies, 0.2% Germans, as well as other minorities. In religious terms, the county population consisted of 96.5% Eastern Orthodox, 2.9% Jewish, 0.3% Roman Catholic, as well as other minorities.

=== Urban population ===
In 1930, the urban population of the county was 21,857 inhabitants, of which 81,9% were Romanians, 14,1% Jews, 0,8% Germans, as well as other minorities. From a religious point of view, the urban population was made up of 83.4% Eastern Orthodox, 14.2% Jewish, 1.0% Roman Catholic, as well as other minorities.

== History ==
Tutova County was established in 1925, and broken up as a result of the 1950 administrative reform.

=== Interbellum ===
In July 1924, ultranationalist student and future Legionary, Constantin Buşila, led attacks against Jewish villages in Tutova County. In April 1932, Ion Zelea Codreanu, the father of Corneliu Zelea Codreanu, is elected to Parliament by the citizens of Tutova County, as a representative of the fascist Legionary movement led by his son.
