= Văleni, Cahul =

Văleni
- Village
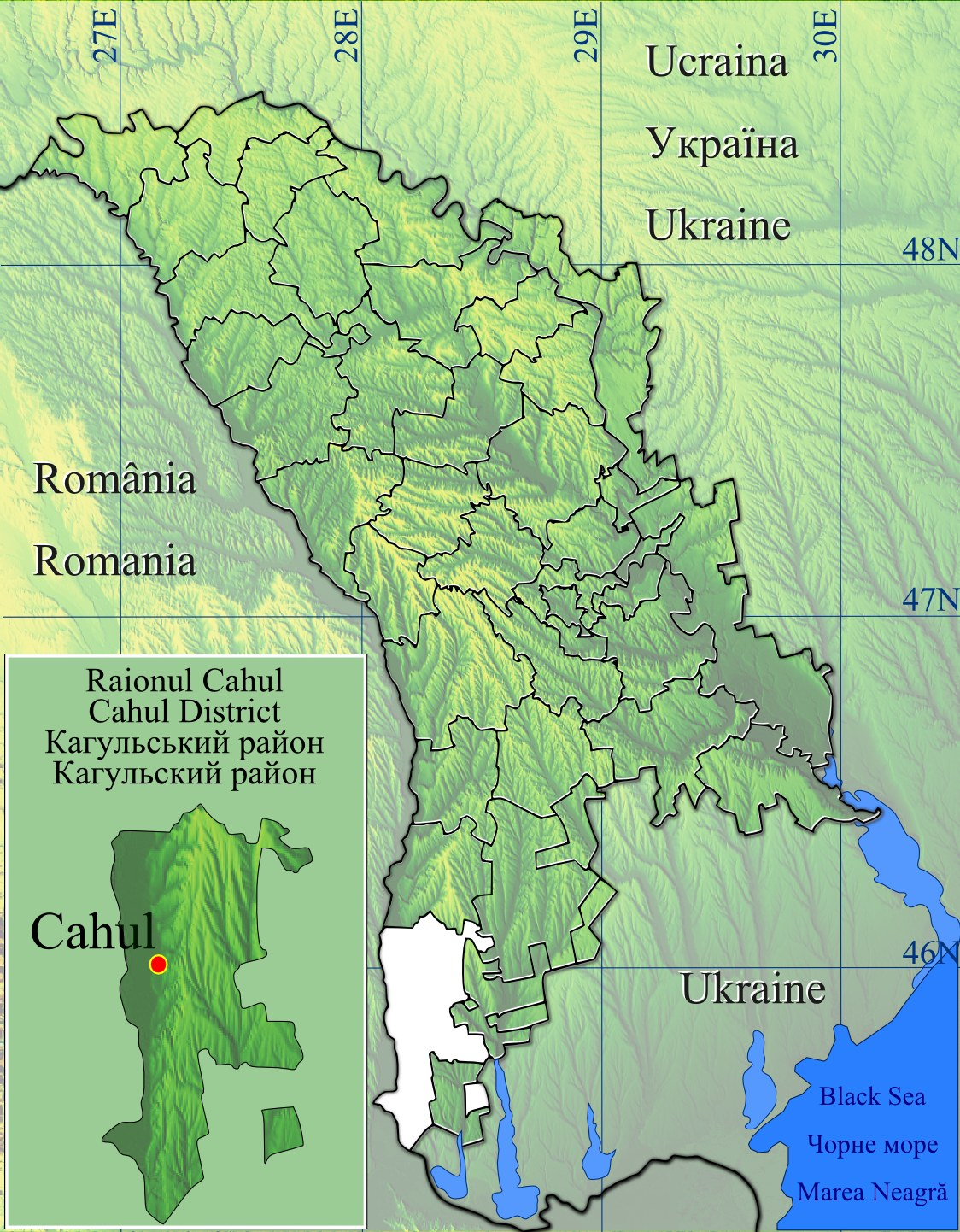
- Location of village within Moldova
- Coordinates: 45°38′26″N 28°10′35″E
- Country: Moldova
- District: Cahul District

Government
  - Mayor: Silvia Știrbeț

Population (2014 census)
  - Total: 3,020
- Time zone: UTC+2 (EET)
  - Summer (DST): UTC+3 (EEST)
- Postal code: MD-5322

Văleni is a village in southwestern Cahul District, Moldova, about 25 km (16 mi) to the north of Galați.

== Notable people ==
- Gheorghe Vodă (1934 in Văleni – 2007 in Chişinău) was a writer from Moldova.
- Lidia - known also as Boonika (meaning grandma) - she became famous in the Eurovision Song Contest of 2005 by banging the drum on the Moldovan entry, which took sixth place! "Boonika Bate Doba" ("Grandmamma Beats the Drum-a") was performed in English and Romanian by Zdob și Zdub
