= Putna County =

Județul Putna
- County (Județ)
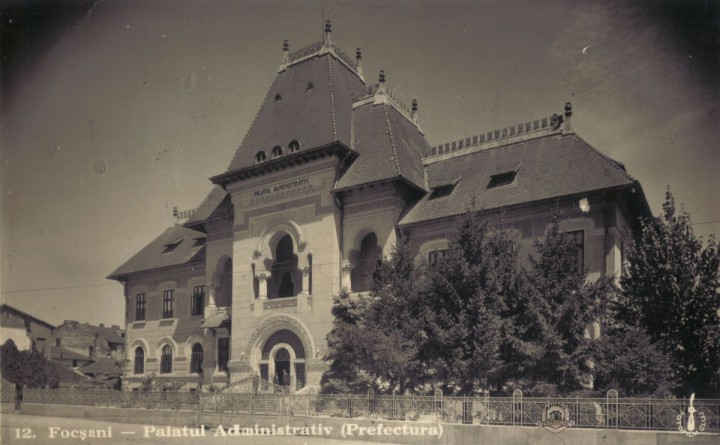
- The Putna County Prefecture building from the interwar period.

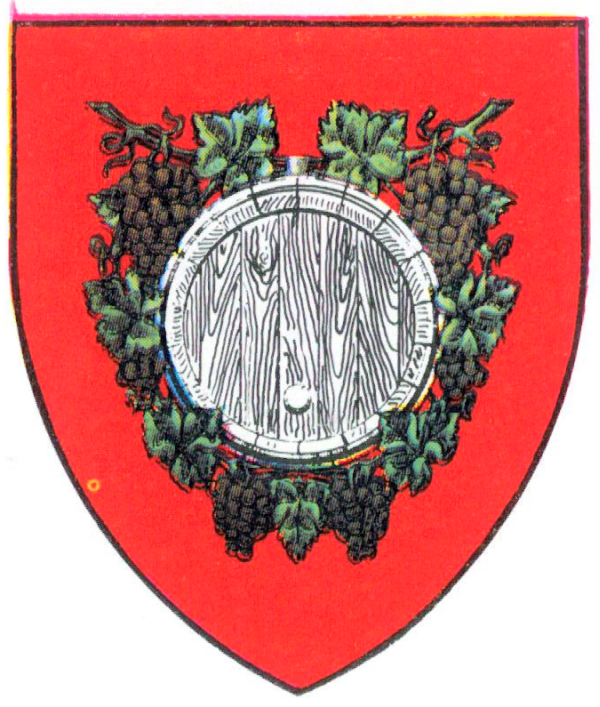
- Coat of arms

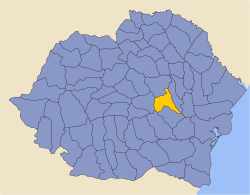
- Country: Romania
- Historic region: Moldavia
- County seat (Reședință de județ): Focșani
- Established: 1859
- Ceased to exist: Administrative reform of 1950

Area
  - Total: 3,340 km^{2} (1,290 sq mi)

Population (1930)
  - Total: 194,105
  - Density: 58.1/km^{2} (151/sq mi)
- Time zone: UTC+2 (EET)
  - Summer (DST): UTC+3 (EEST)

Putna County was a county (Romanian: județ) in the Kingdom of Romania, in southern Moldavia. The county seat was Focșani.

The county was located in the central-eastern part of Greater Romania, in the south of Moldavia. Today, most of the territory of the former county is part of Vrancea County. The county was bordered on the north by Bacău County, to the east by Tecuci County, to the south by the counties of Râmnicu Sărat and Buzău, and to the west by Trei-Scaune County.

== Administrative organization ==
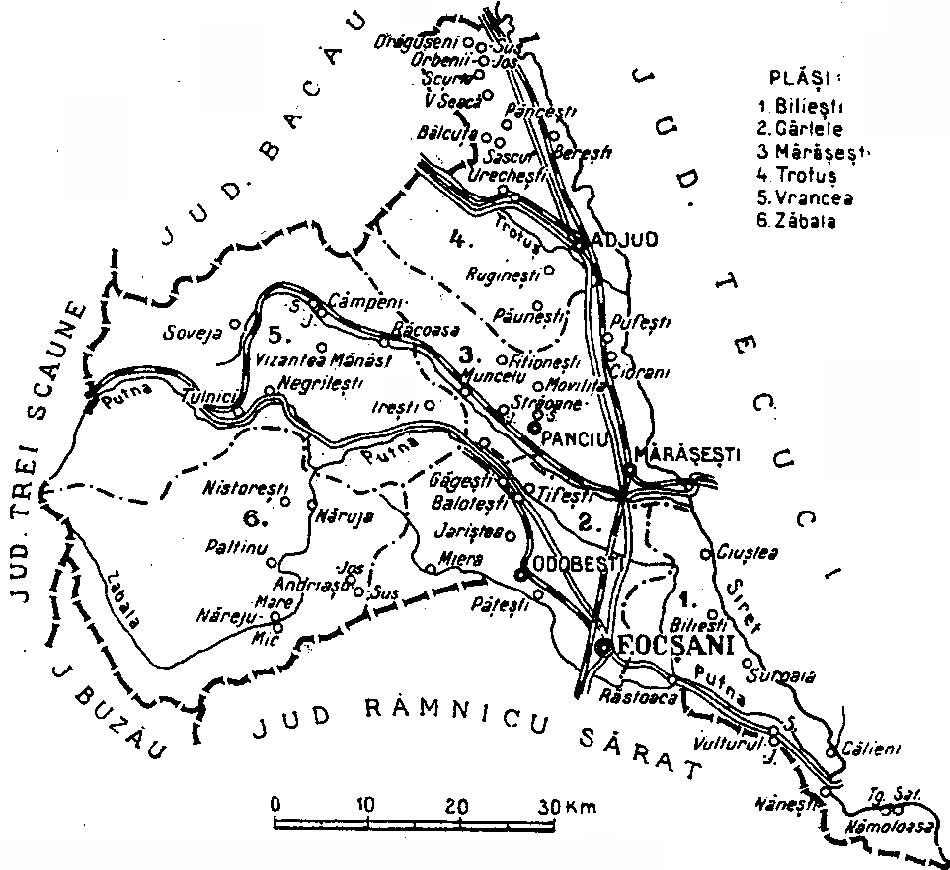
Map of Putna County as constituted in 1938.

The capital of Putna County was the town of Focşani. The county had five cities (Focșani, Adjud, Mărășești, Odobești, and Panciu) and 265 villages.

In 1930, Putna County was administratively divided into three districts (plăși):

1. Plasa Mărășești, with 36 villages
2. Plasa Trotuș, with 46 villages
3. Plasa Vrancea, with 48 villages

Subsequently, three more districts were established:

4. Plasa Zăbala, with 59 villages
5. Plasa Gârlele, with 42 villages
6. Plasa Biliești, with 34 villages

== Judicial organization ==
Putna County had a court with two sections, fourteen magistrates, one chief prosecutor and two prosecutors in the Galați Court of Appeal and nine judges in Focșani, Adjud, Mărășești, Panciu, Năruja, Sascut, Tulnici, and Vidra, with a total of eighteen magistrates.

== Population ==
According to the 1930 census data, the county population was 194,105 inhabitants, 93.3% Romanians, 3.5% Jews, 1.2% Romanies, 1.1% Hungarians, as well as other minorities. From the religious point of view, 94.2% were Eastern Orthodox, 3.6% were Jewish, 1.6% were Roman Catholic, as well as other minorities.

=== Urban population ===
In 1930, the county's urban population was 58,683 inhabitants, 84.6% Romanians, 10.9% Jews, 1.5% Hungarians, as well as other minorities. From the religious point of view, the urban population was composed of 85.1% Eastern Orthodox, 11.1% Jewish, 2.2% Roman Catholic, as well as other minorities.

== Religion ==
The county contained 199 Orthodox churches, a Roman Catholic church, a Roman Catholic chapel, two Armenian churches and twelve synagogues. There were two Orthodox monasteries in Vizantea and Soveja and seven Orthodox hermitages: Valea Neagră, Brazi, Trotușanu, Mușunoaiele, Buluc, Tarnița, and Lepșa. The county had three Orthodox protopopes residing in Focșani, Drăgușeni, and Vrancea and was in the eparchy (bishopric) of Roman (in the metropolitanate of Moldavia and Suceava).
