= Tecuci County =

Județul Tecuci
- County (Județ)
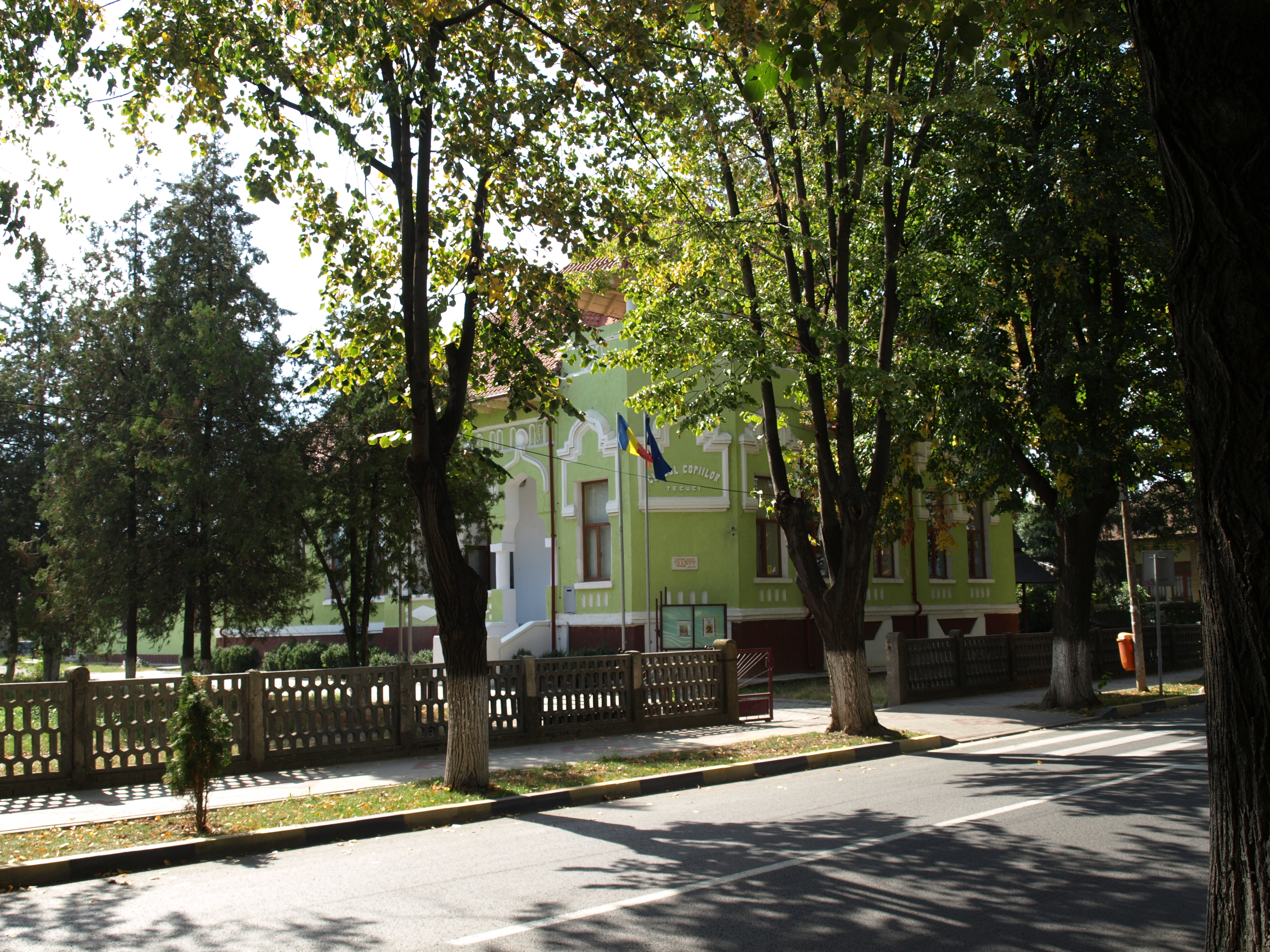
- The Tecuci County Prefecture building from the interwar period, currently a city youth club.

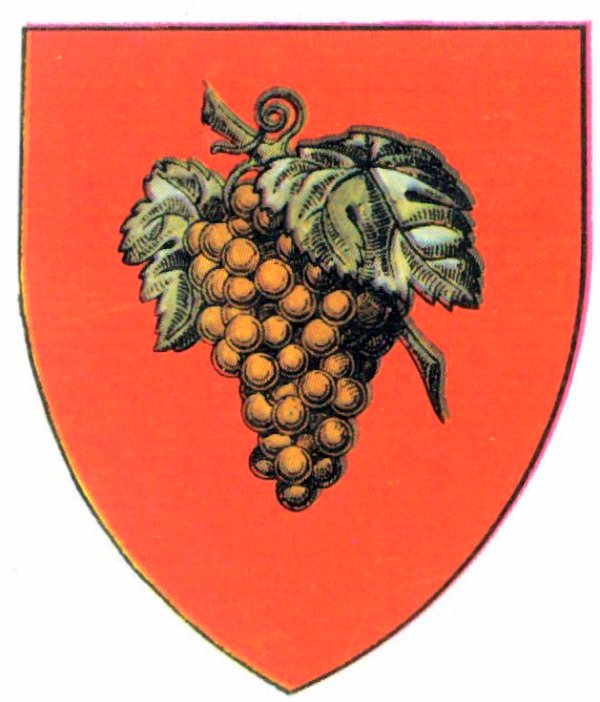
- Coat of arms

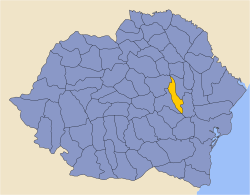
- Country: Romania
- Historic region: Moldavia
- County seat (Reședință de județ): Tecuci
- Ceased to exist: Administrative reform of 1950

Area
  - Total: 2,408 km^{2} (930 sq mi)

Population (1930)
  - Total: 156,405
  - Density: 64.95/km^{2} (168.2/sq mi)
- Time zone: UTC+2 (EET)
  - Summer (DST): UTC+3 (EEST)

Tecuci County was a county (Romanian: județ) in the Kingdom of Romania, in the historical region Moldavia. The county seat was Tecuci.

The county was located in the central-eastern part of Greater Romania, in the south of Moldavia. The county bordered on the east with the counties of Tutova and Covurlui, on the south with the county Râmnicu Sărat, and to the west with the counties Putna and Bacău. Because of its shape, its northern extreme was the meeting point of Bacău and Tutova counties.

== Administrative organization ==
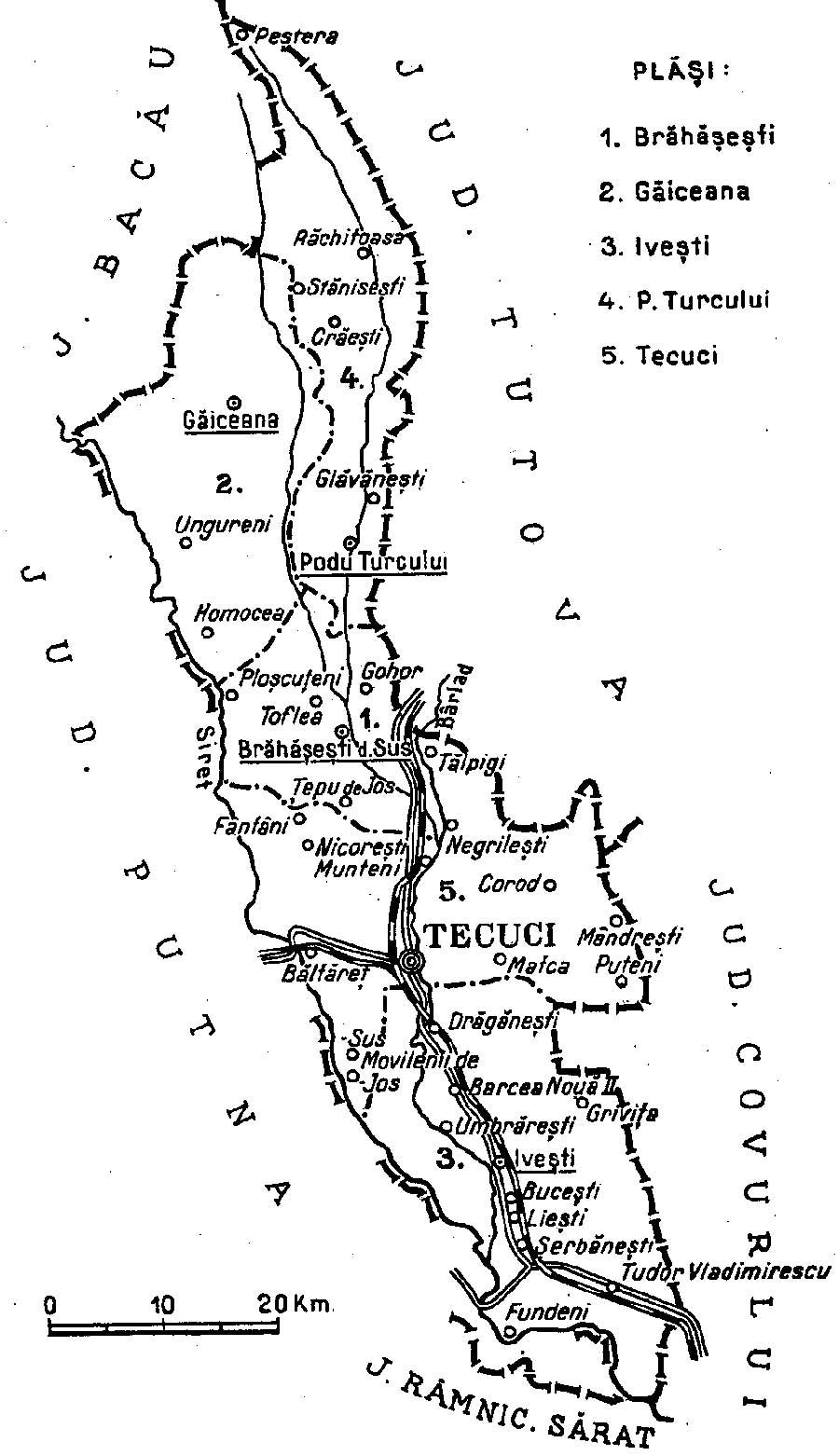
Map of Tecuci County as constituted in 1938.

The capital of Tecuci County was the town of Tecuci.

Tecuci County was initially divided administratively into three districts (plăși):

1. Plasa Homocea, headquartered at Homocea
2. Plasa Ivești, headquartered at Ivești
3. Plasa Podu Turcului, headquartered at Podu Turcului

Subsequently, the territory was reorganized into five districts:

1. Plasa Găiceana, headquartered at Găiceana
2. Plasa Brăhășești, headquartered at Brăhășești
3. Plasa Ivești, headquartered at Ivești
4. Plasa Podu Turcului, headquartered at Podu Turcului
5. Plasa Tecuci, headquartered at Tecuci

== Population ==
According to the 1930 census data, the county population was 156,405 inhabitants, 94.9% were Romanians, 2.0% Gypsies, 1.8% Jews, as well as other minorities. From the religious point of view, 96.3% were Eastern Orthodox, 1.9% were Jewish, 1.6% were Roman Catholic, as well as other minorities.

=== Urban population ===
In 1930, the county's urban population was 17,172 inhabitants, 86.5% Romanians, 8.9% Jews, 1.1% Hungarians, 1.0% Gypsies, 0.8% Germans, as well as other minorities. From the religious point of view, the urban population was composed of 88.3% Eastern Orthodox, 9.2% Jewish, 1.3% Roman Catholic, 0.5% Lutheran, as well as other minorities.

== Abolition ==
The county was disbanded following the fall of the monarchy in Romania and the coming of Communism. It was divided in September 1950 between Regiunea Putna and Regiunea Bârlad, and in 1952 after the merger of the two, it remained part of Regiunea Bârlad. In 1960, its territory was again divided between Regiunea Bârlad and Regiunea Galați, and since 1968, much of its old territory (including the capital) belonged to Galați County, some smaller areas belonging to today's Vrancea County and Bacău County.
