= Cahul District =

Coordinates: 45°50′N 28°20′E

Cahul
- District
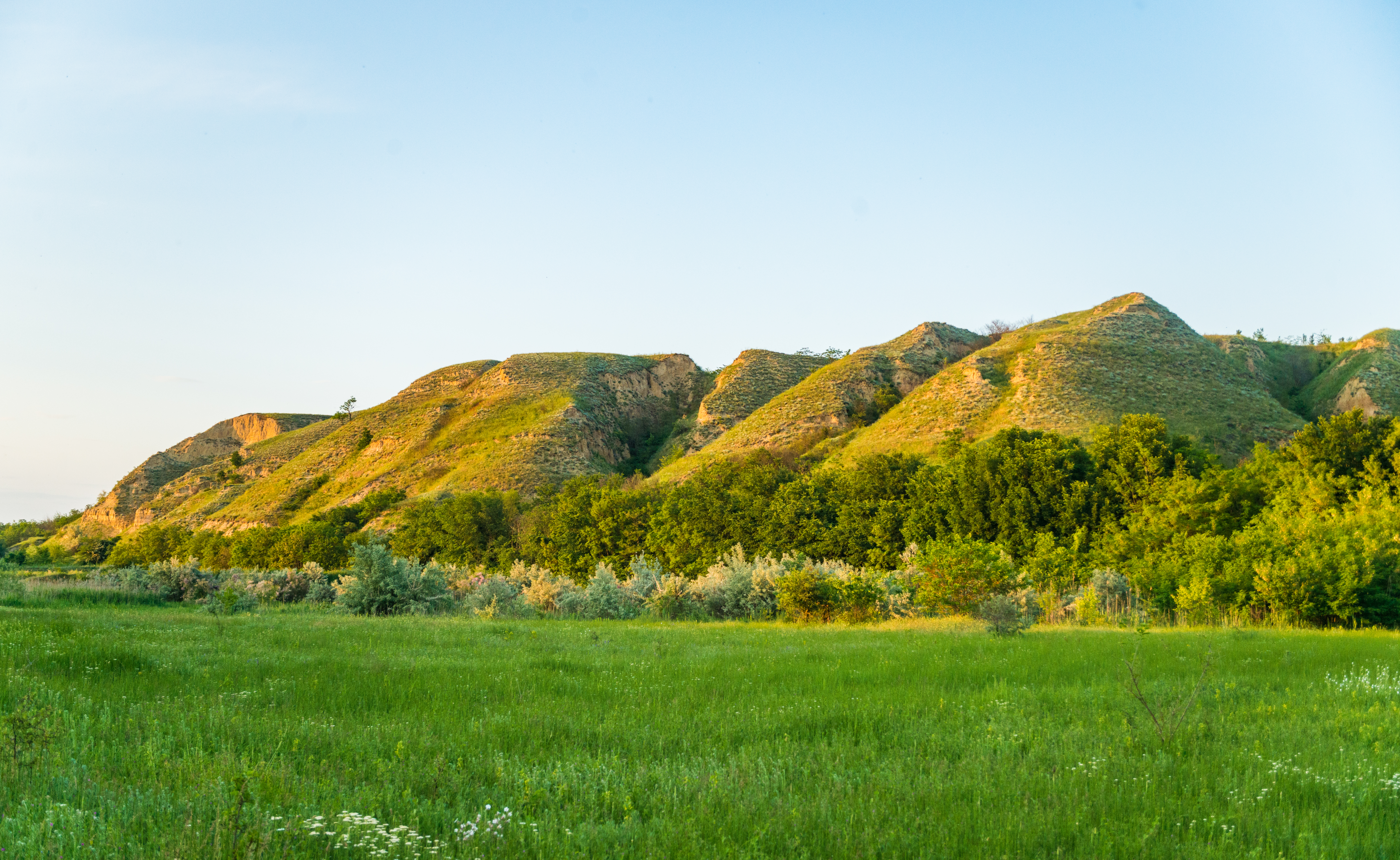
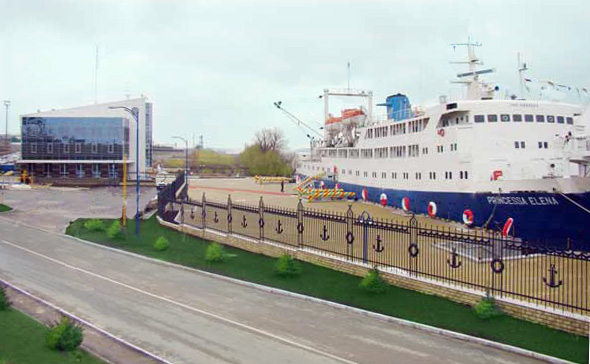
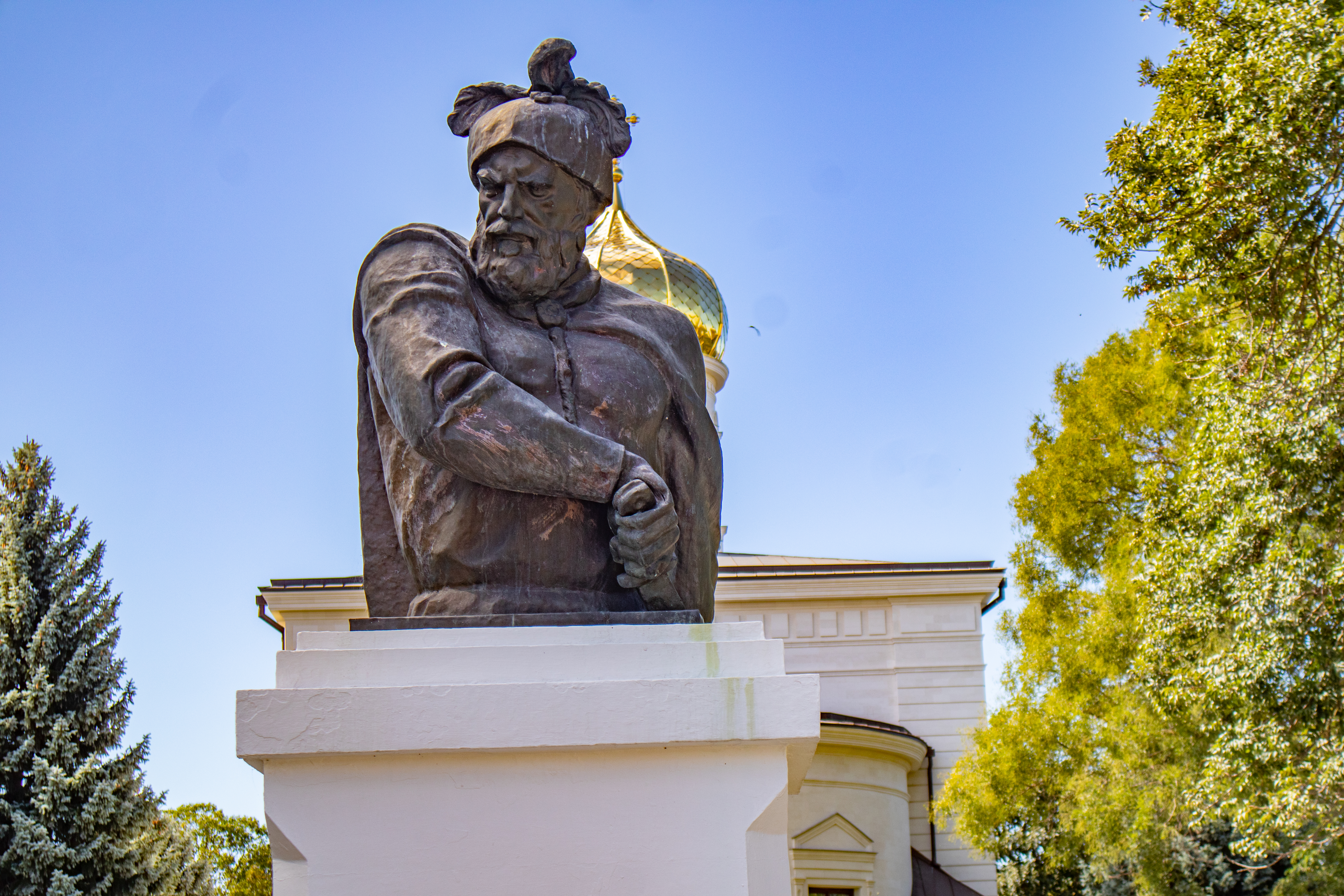
- From the top, Văleni Outcrop, Port of Giurgiulești, John III the Terrible statue

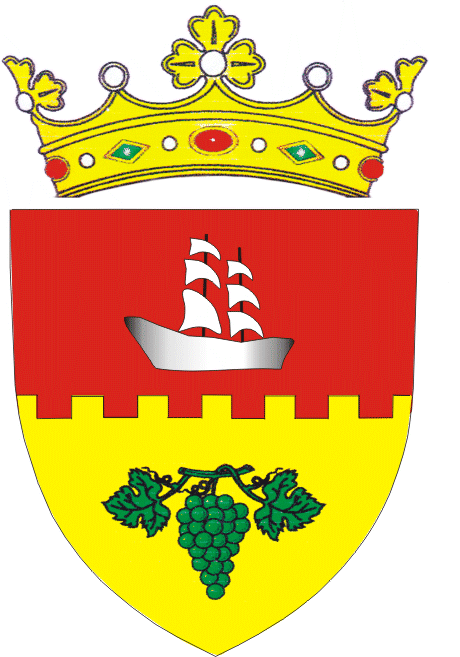
- Flag Coat of arms

- Country: Republic of Moldova
- Administrative center (Oraș-reședință): Cahul
- Established: 23 December 1964, 2002

Government
  - Raion President: Pavel Groza (2023) (PAS)

Area
  - Total: 1,545.3 km^{2} (596.6 sq mi)

Population (2024)
  - Total: 72,775
  - Density: 47.094/km^{2} (121.97/sq mi)
- Time zone: UTC+2 (EET)
  - Summer (DST): UTC+3 (EEST)
- Area code: +373 39
- Car plates: CH
- Website: www.cahul.md

Cahul (Romanian pronunciation: [kaˈhul]) is a district (Romanian: raion) in the south of Moldova, with the administrative center at Cahul. As of the 2024 Census, Cahul District had a population of 72,775.

== History ==
The district has been inhabited since the Stone Age (50-45,000 BC). Two ancient settlements were founded around 1300 BC; archaeologists have found items belonging to the Bronze Age (15th-13th centuries BC). According to estimates of specialists, another village was established here around 300-400 BC. That has been confirmed by the remains of houses burned and the fragments of clay pots. Archaeological monuments recorded a settlement arising from employment of Dacia in the Roman Empire and devastated by the Huns in 376. The presence of nomads in these places is attested by the four burial mounds.

Localities with the earliest documented attestation are Crihana Veche, Manta, Valeni, Slobozia Mare, and Larga Veche; they were documented for the first time in 1425–1447. In the 16th and 17th centuries, the economy developed in agriculture, winery, and trade, along with an increase in population. On August 1, 1770, near Cahul lake, the Battle of Cahul took place (Russo-Turkish War, 1768-1774). It was the most important land battle of the Russo-Turkish War and one of the largest battles of the 18th century. In 1812, after the Russo-Turkish War, there was an intense russification of the native population during the occupation of Basarabia by the Russian Empire during this period (1812–1856, 1878–1917). Between 1813 and 1850, the Tsarist government colonized some of the region with Russians, Ukrainians, Bulgarians, and Gagauz. These ethnic groups now constitute 21% of the population of the district.

In 1856–1878, the district became part of Romania after the Crimean War. After the collapse of the Russian Empire, Bessarabia united with Romania (1918–1940, 1941–1944); the district was the center of Cahul County. In 1940, after the Molotov–Ribbentrop Treaty, Basarabia was occupied by the USSR. In 1991, as a result of the proclamation of Independence of Moldova, Cahul County was integrated into this country (1991–2003). In 2003, Cahul became an administrative unit of Moldova.

== Geography ==
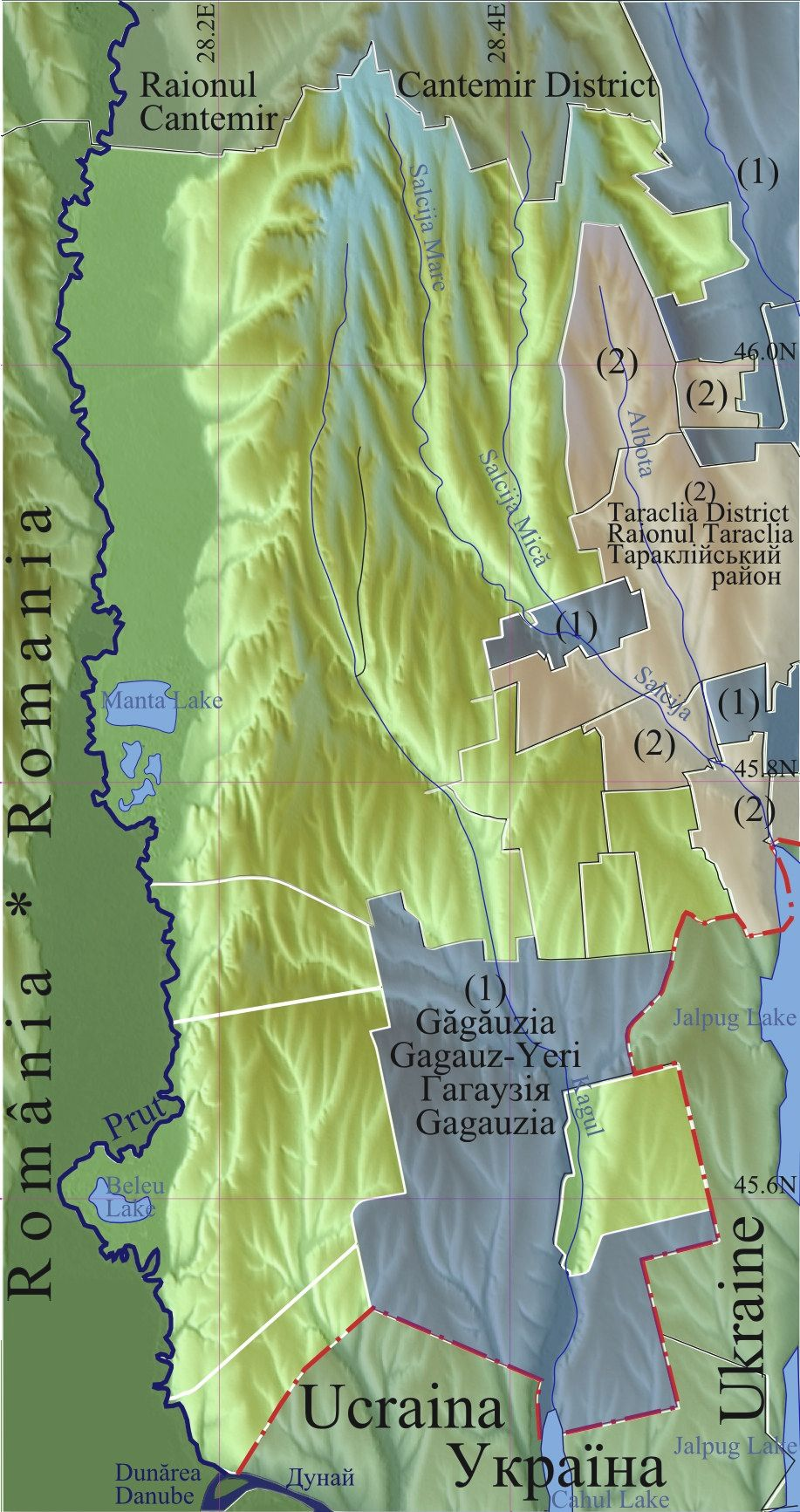
Physical map of Cahul District

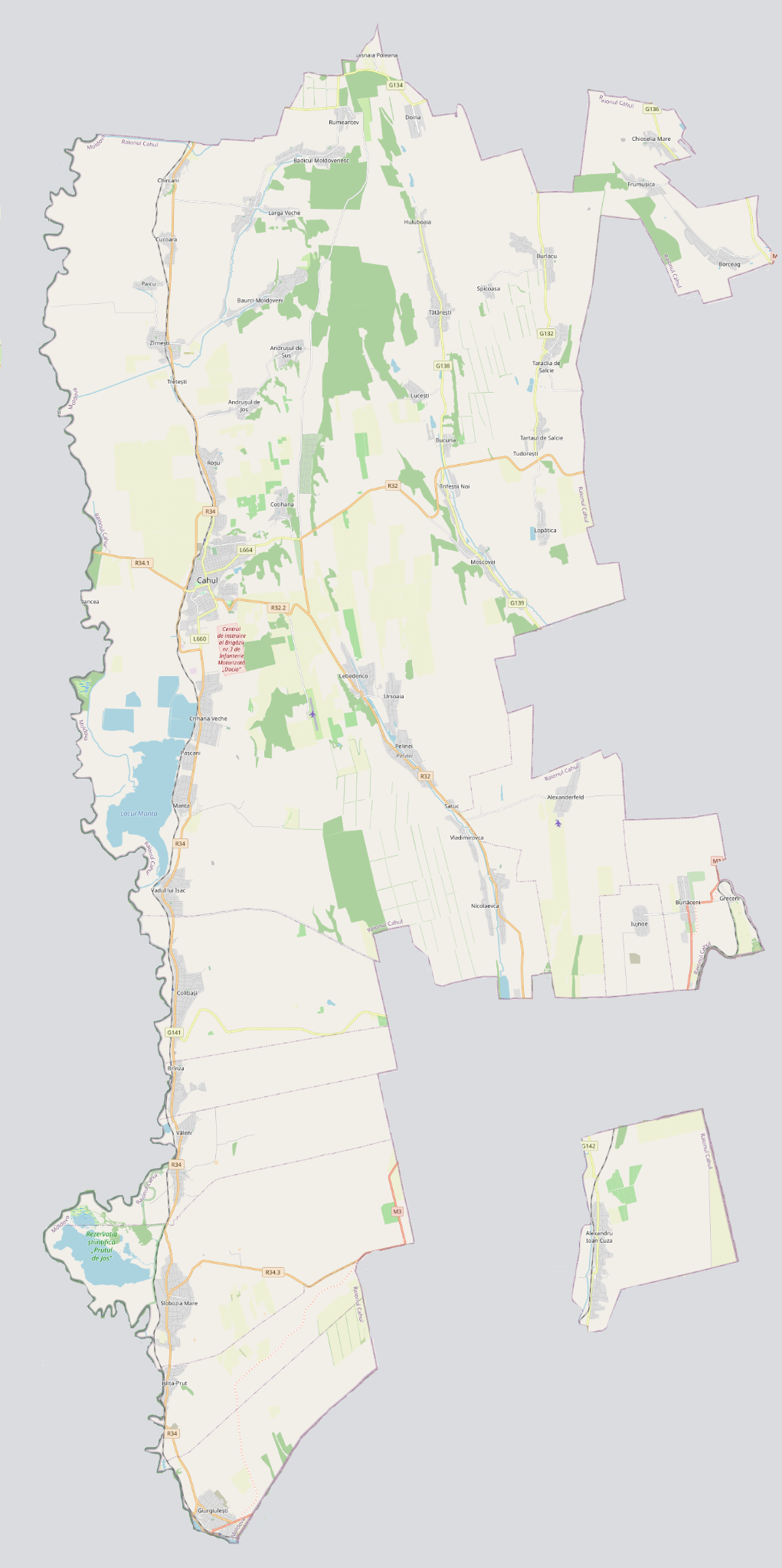
Administrative map of Cahul District

Cahul district is located in the southern part of the Republic of Moldova. The district is located in the extreme southern point of Moldova in Giurgiulești village. Cantemir District is in the north, Gagauzia in the northeast, Taraclia District in the east, the border of Ukraine in the south and Romania in the west. The land is made up of hilly plains with variations in altitude from 230 to 240 m (750 to 790 ft) in the north (Plateau Tigheci), and 5 to 10 m (16 to 33 ft) near the Danube. There is a mild amount of erosion.

=== Climate ===
The climate is temperate continental. The region is considered the most arid and hottest in Moldova. Temperatures are 2 to 3 °C (36 to 37 °F) higher than the other regions. The amount of precipitation during the year is uneven (400 to 550 millimetres [16 to 22 in]) and there are often periods of drought.

=== Fauna ===
Animal life includes typical European steppe fauna, with the presence of mammals, such as foxes, hedgehogs, deer, wild boar, polecat, wild cat, ermine and others. Birds include partridges, crows, eagles, starling and swallow.

=== Flora ===
Forests occupy 11.5% of the district. They are made up of tree species such as acacia, oak, ash, hornbeam, linden, maple and walnut. Other plant life includes wormwood, knotweed, fescue and nettle.

=== Rivers ===
The hydrographic network is based on the Prut River and the Danube River, which forms meadows, ponds, natural lakes. The two biggest natural lakes in Moldova are in this region, Manta (21 km2) and Beleu (11 km2). An area of 1,200 meters is accessible from the Danube to the Black Sea, and basins of Central and Eastern Europe.

== Administrative subdivisions ==
- Localities: 56
- Administrative center: Cahul
- Cities: Cahul
- Villages: 18
- Communes: 37

== Demographics ==
As of the 2024 Census, the district population was 72,775, of which 29.3% was urban and 70.7% was rural.

=== Ethnic groups ===
Ethnic group	% of total
Moldovans *	80.6
Romanians *	5.4
Ukrainians	3.9
Russians	3.4
Bulgarians	3.7
Gagauz	2.4
Romani	0.1
Other	0.5
Undeclared	0.1

Footnote: * There is an ongoing controversy regarding the ethnic identification of Moldovans and Romanians.

=== Religion ===
- Christians - 97.1%
  - Orthodox Christians - 90.2%
  - Protestant - 7.0%
  - Catholics - 0%
- Other - 0.1%
- No Religion - 1.4%
- Not declared: 1.3%

== Economy ==
In terms of economic development, Cahul district is characterized by the development of industries based primarily on various raw materials. There are 11 private wineries and 8 bakeries. In the cheese industry, there is a factory, collecting cereal and processing vegetables and fruit. Light industry is present in two garment factories (SA Tricon and Laboratorio Tessala Mol SRL). Building materials are present in plant and plant ceramsite concrete. Agriculture is the main branch of the district. Of the total 154,600 ha, 64% is agricultural land. The largest share of arable land is: 81%, perennial plantations. 18% incumbent, and 1% vegetable plantations.

== Education ==
The total number of educational institutions is 129. The total number of students in schools is 23,059, in colleges is 1,450, in vocational schools is 776, in universities is 2,547, and in sports schools is 585.

== Culture ==
There are four museums, 85 bands, 25 with the title of model, 47 houses of culture, and 48 libraries.

== Politics ==
Cahul district has mainly right-wing parties. In Moldova, Cahul is represented by the AEI. The PCRM has had a continuous fall in percentage the last three elections

During the last three elections AEI had an increase of 43.2%

Parliament elections results
Year	AEI	PCRM
2010	54.80% 29,838	37.77% 20,568
July 2009	57.76% 30,787	38.36% 20,447
April 2009	41.22% 20,840	42.69% 21,582

=== Elections ===
Summary of 28 November 2010 Parliament of Moldova election results in Cahul District
Parties and coalitions	Votes	%	+/−
Party of Communists of the Republic of Moldova	20,568	37.77	−0.59
Liberal Democratic Party of Moldova	18,002	33.06	+9.54
Democratic Party of Moldova	6,347	11,66	+1.00
Liberal Party	4,911	9.02	−6.69
European Action Movement	1,223	2.25	+2.25
Party Alliance Our Moldova	578	1.06	-6.63
Other Party	2,840	5.18	+1.30
Total (turnout 57.84%)	54,824	100.00	

== Health ==
Cahul district has a hospital with 500 beds, a center of family doctors, 28 family doctors' offices, 9 health centers and 12 medical points.

== Tourism ==
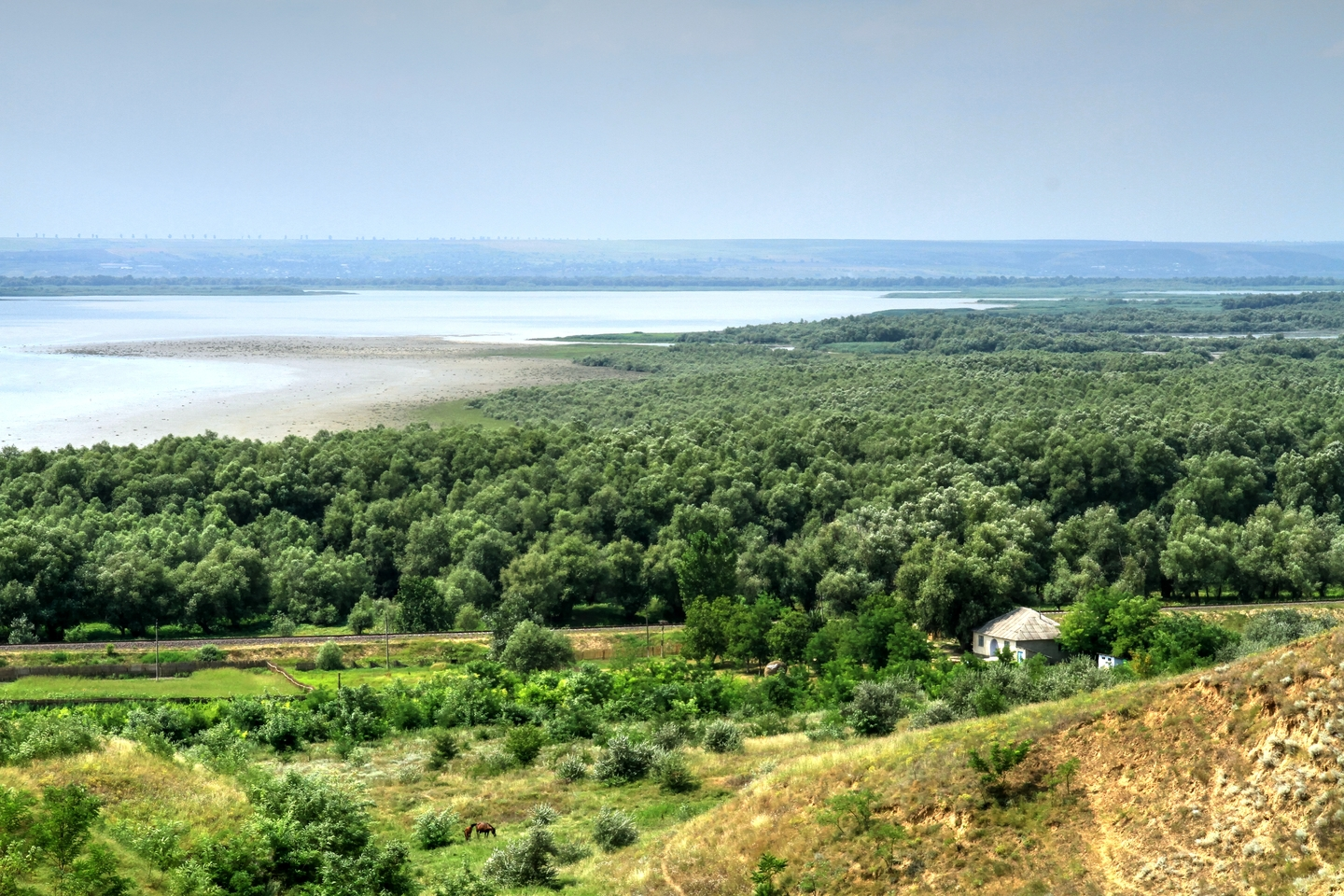
Beleu Lake

- The "Nufărul Alb" ("White Nymphaea") Balneotherapy and Well-being Centre, located in Cahul, is well known for its thermal spas.
- Old Rite Eastern Orthodox Church in Cahul city
- Cathedral of St. Michael and Gabriel in Cahul
- Monument to heroes of the Battle of Larga 1770, Badicul Moldovenesc

== See also ==
- Cahul County
- Talk: Cahul district (Romanian)
