= Administrative divisions of the Romanian People's Republic =

A new territorial division of the Romanian People's Republic was introduced in 1950. Following the Soviet model, a structure of regions and raions (districts) was created, replacing the former system of județe (counties) and their subdivisions. Further changes were implemented during the 1950s and 1960s.

== History ==
The administrative reorganisation was followed by a new territorial division of Romania. Preparations began in January 1949, with the opportunity of discussing the law about the so-called Sfaturi Populare (People's Councils), when the leaders of the Romanian Workers' Party (PMR) decided to call on the help of the Soviet counselors for the division of the territory of the Romanian People's Republic into raions. Until then, Romania had been divided into județe (counties), organised into plăși and rural and urban comune (communes). The county, as a local administration form, has its origins in the medieval divisions of Wallachia. After the formation of modern-day Romania, the name extended over Moldavia also (1859), following Dobrudja (1878) and Transylvania (1923), the latter already having its own subdivision in counties under the Grand Principality of Transylvania. In the period of King Carol's dictatorship (1938–1940), the counties were abolished by forming 10 ținuturi (lands).

The chiaburi (the Romanian equivalent of kulaks) were the direct "target" of the administrative reforms. Discussions regarding the raionation were retaken at the Plenara CC (the Session of the Central Committee of the Workers' Party) between 15 and 17 May 1950, in the context of preparing the elections for the People's Councils. Some members of the CC were of the opinion that the division into counties should be maintained, because Romania didn't have the territory of the USSR to be divided into "regions". But Miron Constantinescu sustained that: "the term of raionation is the correct one, because it underlines the characteristic of this reorganisation and the expression used in Stalin's quote is raionation". Also, he presented the Report regarding the raionation to the Session, where he underlined the fact that "all of the content of the criteria proposed here is drawn up after the study of the Soviet material, on the basis of the Soviet teachings and on the basis of the concrete support that the Soviet counselors gave to us, to whom we thank for their help." At the end of July a central commission of the Workers' Party (including Soviet counselors) was established to prepare the raionation of the territory.

The raionation law was published on September 6, radically changing the administrative division of Romania. Instead of the 58 counties, 424 plăși and 6,276 communes, the territory of the RPR was divided into 28 regions, 177 raions, 148 cities and towns and 4,052 communes. The process of raionation once finished, the governors organised the elections for the People's Councils on December 3, 1950.

=== Timeline ===
- September 6, 1950 - By Law nr. 5 the 58 counties (including the 424 plăși and 6,276 rural and urban communes) were abolished, being replaced by 28 regions (composed of 177 raions, 148 cities and towns and 4,052 communes)
- September 19, 1952 - Decree nr.331. By merging, the number of regions was reduced to 18: Arad, Bacău, Baia Mare, Bârlad, București, Cluj, Constanța, Craiova, Galați, Hunedoara, Iași, Oradea, Pitești, Ploiești, Stalin, Suceava, Timișoara and, for the first time after the Great Union, an administrative entity created on ethnic criteria, Regiunea Autonomă Maghiară (The Magyar Autonomous Region);
- 1956 - An intermediary step through which the regions Arad and Bârlad were abolished
- 1960 - The final step, with territory redistribution and region renamings. The Magyar administrative entity was renamed Regiunea Mureș-Autonomă Maghiară (Mureș Region - Magyar Autonomous), also modifying its territory. In the end, the number of regions was reduced to 16
- February 1968 - By the law adopted by Marea Adunare Națională (the Great National Assembly) the old county administrative and territorial division came into act. On January 14, 1968 a project-map was published and was discussed within the organizations of the Communist Party, subsequently undergoing some changes. The final result, substantially different from the original territorial organization prior to 1950, comprised 39 counties, the Bucharest municipality, 236 cities and towns, of which 47 municipalities and 2,706 communes having 13,149 villages.
