= Cloșca =

Cloşca may refer to several places in Romania:

- Cloşca, a village in Horia Commune, Constanţa County
- Cloşca, a village in Horia Commune, Tulcea County
- Cloșca, Satu Mare, a residential district in Satu Mare County
- Hilişeu-Cloşca, a village in Hilișeu-Horia Commune, Botoșani County
