= Free and Independent Faction =

Free and Independent Faction Fracțiunea Liberă și Independentă (Fracționiștii)
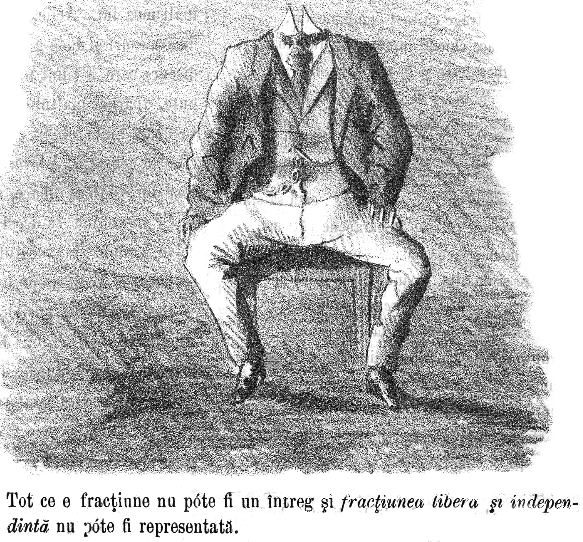
- Personification of the Faction as a headless body (Ghimpele, February 1868)
- Leader: Nicolae Ionescu (first); Dimitrie Tacu (last)
- Founder: Simion Bărnuțiu
- Founded: c. 1864
- Dissolved: c. 1884
- Merged into: National Liberal Party; Conservative Party
- Headquarters: Iași
- Newspaper: Tribuna Română (1866); Dreptatea (1867–1870); D̦iorile (c. 1868); Uniunea Liberală (c. 1871–1873); Gazeta de Bacău (c. 1871); Mișcarea Națională (c. 1880)
- Ideology: Ethnic nationalism (Romanian); National liberalism (Romanian); Republicanism; Regionalism (Western Moldavian); Federalism; Communalism; Nativism; Economic antisemitism Anti-Germanism
- Political position: Center-left to far-left
- National affiliation: Concordia (1867–1869); Unified Opposition Committees (1883)

The Free and Independent Faction or Free and Independent Fraction (Romanian: Fracțiunea Liberă și Independentă, sometimes Fracțiunea Liberală și Independentă, "Independent Liberal Faction", commonly Fracționiștii, "The F(r)actionalists") was a nationalist and national liberal party in Romania, regionally centered on Western Moldavia. Originally informal, and defined by its adversaries, the Faction mainly comprised pupils and followers of the philosopher Simion Bărnuțiu. During most of its existence, it had as its recognized leader the academic and polemicist Nicolae Ionescu.

Consolidated during the election of Carol I as Domnitor, the Faction opposed his rule, favoring either an elective monarchy with a native prince or a republican system. Secondary Factionalist leaders included Dimitrie Tacu, Alecu D. Holban and Nicu Ceaur-Aslan, who had varying levels of involvement with Western Moldavian separatism in 1866. The group's nativism bordered on violent xenophobia, endorsing economic antisemitism and anti-Germanism. The party also stood for democratization, including radical land reform and a reshaping of the census suffrage, while its regional ethos resulted in support for federalism, then communalism.

Such stances created tension between the Factionalists and most other groups on the left-liberal fringe, making the Faction an uneasy partner in the "Red" government alliances of the 1860s and '70s. For pragmatic reasons, Ionescu and his followers defended Carol against the conspiratorial movement known as "Republic of Ploiești", but did not entirely reject its agenda. Soon after this incident, a conservative and monarchist movement emerged in Moldavia around Junimea club, with whom the Factionalists had a consuming rivalry. A Moderate Liberal Party, headed by Ionescu's rival Mihail Kogălniceanu, also drained the Faction of its votes after 1877. Prolonged controversies surrounded Factionalist participation in the local government of Iași city and Covurlui County. Within this setting, Factionalists participated in the effort to establish a National Liberal Party (PNL), but then withdrew from it.

Ionescu's career peaked in 1876, when he was Minister of Foreign Affairs in the "Red" cabinet of Ion Brătianu, and began to separate himself from the Factionalists. He was deposed for his opposition to the war of independence, which also brought clashes between the PNL and the Faction over the issue of Jewish emancipation. In 1879, the Faction was narrowly prevented from forming the national government alongside conservative "Whites", after which it steadily declined in importance. In the early 1880s, after a brief alliance with the newly formed Conservative Party, most of the Faction dissolved into the PNL, which had emerged as the dominant "Red" group in the Kingdom of Romania. A Factionalist dissidence survived as part of the Conservative-ran Opposition Committees, but also lost members to the PNL; the last surviving Factionalist cell, formed around Holban, became a Conservative chapter in the 1890s. Some of the party tenets, in particular its antisemitism, were revived in the 1910s by A. C. Cuza and his Democratic Nationalists.

== Creation ==
=== Beginnings ===
The origins of Bărnuțiu's movement can be traced back to "the very last years" of Alexandru Ioan Cuza's rule as Domnitor over the "United Principalities", which had confederated Moldavia with neighboring Wallachia. The group was centered on the last Moldavian capital, Iași, where Bărnuțiu and Ionescu were both active as educators. Following Bărnuțiu's death in 1864, the Faction had for its "chiefs" Alexandru Gheorghiu, Alecu D. Holban, Theodor Lateș, Dimitrie Tacu, Iorgu Tacu, alongside Constantin Corjescu and his brother Dimitrie. As noted by their one-time colleague George Panu, they were "students and disciples of Bărnuțiu", who "had hypnotized them, had inoculated into them his fanatical ideas; they spoke like him, they dressed like him, they walked like him, and quite clearly they thought like him." Defining itself as "national and liberal", Bărnuțianism was strongly nativist and primordialist, circulating the claim that old Romanian law was purely Roman law (see Origin of the Romanians). On such grounds, it conceived Romania as a modern reconstruction of the Roman Republic, secured by protectionism, anti-German sentiment, and economic antisemitism, going as far as to propose the expulsion of all foreigners from Romanian soil. Another eccentricity was the Factionalists' project for a complete land reform, redistributing all available land among Romanian nationals. The agenda was not fully shared by Factionalists such as Nicu Ceaur-Aslan, whose Bacău-based newspaper, Santinela de Bacău, had argued for preserving the boyar nobility and its large estates.

Like most other groups existing before the creation of an independent Kingdom of Romania in the 1880s, the "vaguely liberal" or "most originally liberal" Faction was somewhat diffuse, identified by voluntary allegiance rather than formal membership, and was mainly a parliamentary party. Its earliest rally point was the gazette Tribuna Română ("Romanian Tribune"), published in 1866 as the self-styled exponent of "truly liberal and independent convictions". Despite having a longer history, the party was only formalized around January 1867, following a speech by its recognized leader, who was by then Nicolae Ionescu—his claim to speak for a "free and independent faction" was picked up as a derisive exonym by his adversaries, then accepted by the "Faction" itself; ideally, however, Ionescu favored non-partisan democracy.

A professor of law and brother of the agronomist Ion Ionescu de la Brad, Ionescu had played a marginal role the Moldavian and Wallachian Revolutions of 1848. In 1856–1858, he had also supported the unionist National Party, putting out the French edition of Stéoa Dunării from Brussels. His effort was partly financed by the Moldavian statesman Mihail Kogălniceanu, with whom Ionescu had an on and off friendship. Of the other Factionalists, Alecu Holban and Nicolae Voinov had a similar background: both had been arrested for unionist activity during the Moldavian election of 1858. Without seeking full independence from the Ottoman Empire, from 1860 Cuza's regime took steps toward solidifying the Principalities, which became the nucleus of modern Romania; however, it alienated the political class with its expansive authoritarianism. The liberal wing, or "Reds", envisioned a ceremonial role for the monarchy, within a democratized country: they "admired Cuza's democratism [but] despised his Bonapartist methods". Another issue of contention was Cuza's favorable reception of Romanian Jews: in 1864, Holban published an antisemitic article which the Domnitor read with disgust; he and Kogălniceanu issued a warning against Constituționalul newspaper, which had issued it.

"Red" leaders joined conservatives and centrists in forming a "monstrous coalition" of conspirators, who toppled Cuza in February 1866 and began a search for a foreign Domnitor to inaugurate a hereditary monarchy. Eventually, after Philippe of Belgium withdrew from the race, Carol of Hohenzollern-Sigmaringen became a main candidate for the throne. The Faction itself took a distinct position against the Carlist consensus. Bărnuțian postulates allowed Factionalists to argue that a single Romanian vote against a foreign dynasty was the exercise of a natural right, and would invalidate all other opinions. Still frequenting the National Party, D. Tacu took a more moderate position: like Vasile Pogor and Titu Maiorescu, he was only opposed to Carol specifically, and demanded a prince from Romance-speaking Europe.

Those months also witnessed a collaboration between Holban and the independent radical Bogdan Petriceicu Hasdeu—together with Nicolae Nicoleanu, N. D. Popescu-Popnedea and others, they put out a humorous paper, Satyrul, using Chinese-sounding pseudonyms to comment on political developments and express a measure of sympathy for Cuza. Hasdeu also voiced his rejection of the reemerging Moldavian separatism, giving his conditional support to Carol "in the interest of preserving the Union". Eventually, a plebiscite on the monarchy confirmed Carol as Domnitor, 685,969 votes to 224. Elected to the Constituent Chamber of Bucharest during the parallel race, six Factionalists abstained during the vote to proclaim Carol as the hereditary ruler. Seated among the left and far-left of Chamber, they were: Ionescu, Tacu, Lateș, Nicolae Iamandi, Ianache Lecca, and Ioan Negură. This group threatened to back another candidate for the throne, namely Nicolae Dabija. Iamandi, who had renounced his own ambitions for the throne to serve under Cuza, reputedly allowed Dabija to hold court in his Iași townhouse. Speaking from the Chamber rostrum, Ionescu, who represented six Moldavian counties, voiced his admiration of Cuza's constitutional law, since "although despotic, it yielded decent fruit, being applied with a sense of liberalism."

=== 1866 troubles ===
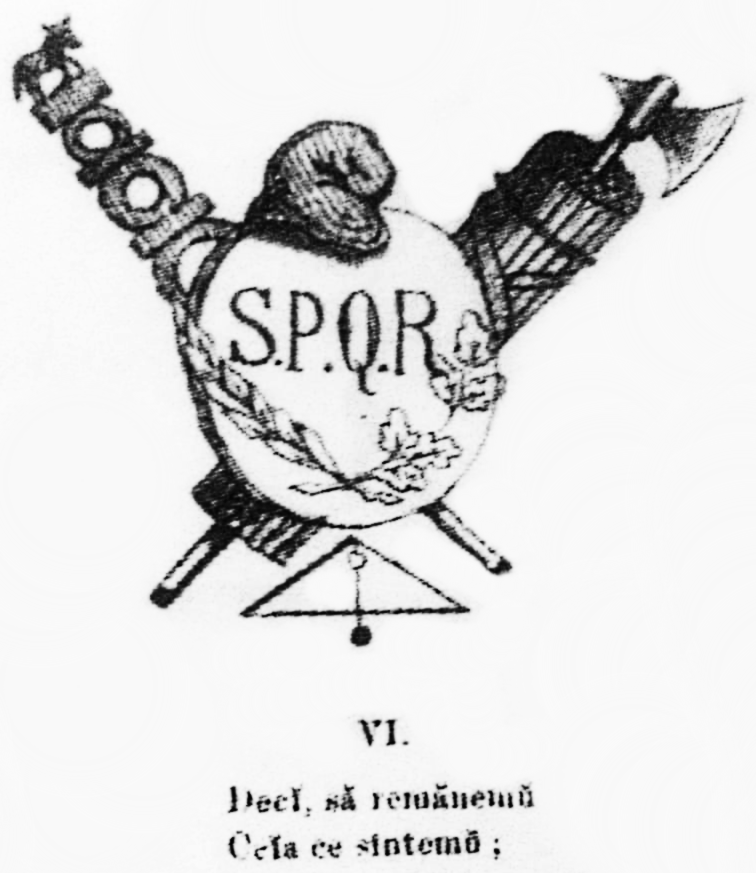
Republican symbolism in Satyrul, April 1866, with the couplet: Decĭ, să remănemŭ / Ceĭa ce sîntemŭ ("So let's just stay / Like we were anyway"), implying that the Romania was de facto a republic, and should have remained so

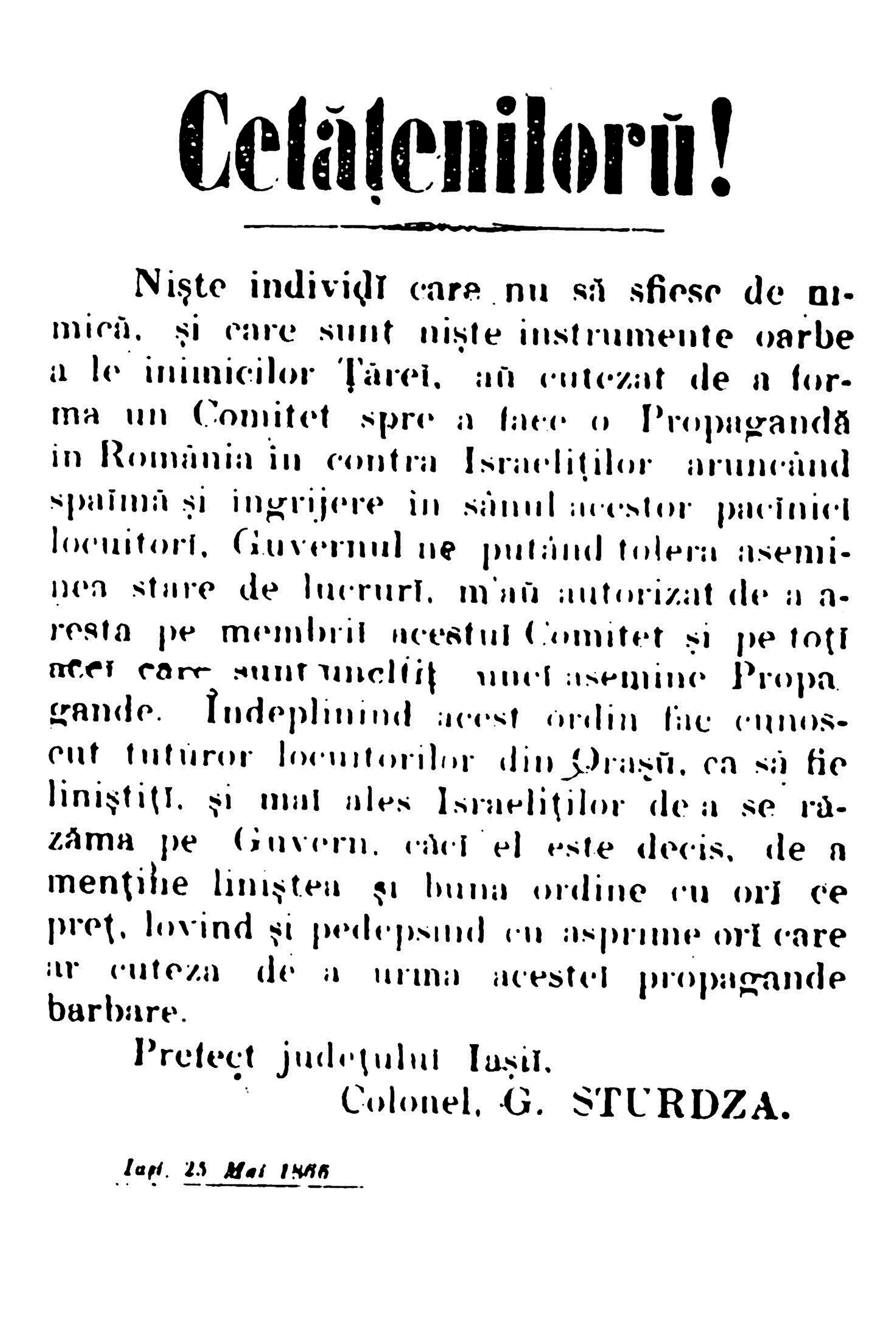
Grigore Sturdza's proclamation upon retaking control of Iași in May 1866, condemning the "barbaric propaganda" of local antisemites

While their initial opposition to Carol had by then been reduced to abstentionism, the Factionalists' core constituency of Iași experienced a separatist rebellion, instigated by Ceaur-Aslan, Calinic Miclescu, Teodor Boldur-Lățescu, and Constantin Moruzi Pecheanu. The movement was almost immediately quashed, but moderate federalism was preserved by a plan of moving the Court of Cassation to Iași, making that city a judicial capital of Romania. In the city itself, the Faction's "group of electors" held meetings during which some advocated full federalism with a separate civilian government for Moldavia. A motion supporting a preferential treatment for Iași was proposed by the lawyer Gheorghe Cigaras with support from Ceaur-Aslan—and also signed by Gheorghiu, Holban, Alexandru M. Șendrea, Petre Suciu, Tacu, Sandu Dudescu, Grigore Cobălcescu, Anastasie Fătu and Vasile Gheorghian, alongside priests Iosif Bobulescu, Neofit Scriban, and Climent Nicolau. However, to the dismay of other deputies who endorsed decentralization (including Tacu and Lateș), Ionescu spoke out against the Court of Cassation proposal, as he expected Iași to be more thoroughly assisted by government.

Carol was ultimately able to take the throne, but, during the same period, there was a breakdown of consensus inside the "monstrous coalition", with heated debates over the passing of the Constitution. A "White" party, comprising centrist and conservative elements, backed Carol's hands-on and gradualist approach to institutional modernization. As claimed by Hasdeu, the emerging anti-liberal coalition, a "scandalous phenomenon", "always paralyzed Romanianism with alienism, and democracy with reaction". Although "too archaic", Hasdeu argued, the Faction "rekindled the Romanian spirit" and mounted resistance against "cosmopolitan ideas". Defining itself as "decentralist and anti-absolutist unionist", the Faction was organizing throughout Western Moldavia, relying on a network of academics, schoolteachers, and youths. At Bârlad, its "national-liberal" chapter was supported by local intellectuals, including brothers Ion and Constantin Codrescu, Ioan Popescu, and Scarlat Vârnav.

Within this context, a deeper controversy erupted over what Hasdeu referred to as "alienism": the issue of Jewish Emancipation, which the "Reds" and the Faction opposed. The latter upheld the notion that a national bourgeoisie could be consolidated "not through free competition, but with legislation that would expel Jews from the country." In May 1866, while a petition to block Jews from obtaining commercial rights was signed by Ionescu and circulated throughout Moldavia, antisemitic riots possibly instigated by the Faction erupted in Iași, Bârlad, Roman and Botoșani. The clampdown was led by Prefect Grigore Sturdza, and resulted in the temporary arrest of various party leaders, including Fătu, Gheorghian, Gheorghiu, Holban and Suciu—alongside sympathizers such as Petru Poni. As noted by historian A. D. Xenopol (who was for a while a Factionalist sympathizer), antisemitism was only present "up front" within the Moldavian Faction and taken up in Wallachia by Cezar Bolliac, but also spread out, more discreetly, among the other political groups. Adolphe Stern, the Jewish community leader, decried the Faction's "mystical and intransigent dogmatism", infused with an "awful hatred" by the "pseudo-intellectual" Bărnuțiu.

Ionescu sided with the moderate-liberal Prime Minister, Ion Ghica, who wanted unrestricted freedoms to be codified by the Constitution. The "Reds" and the Factionalists were pushed into cooperating with each other, mainly because the "Reds" were virtually unrepresented in Moldavian cities, but remained distinct parties; in crucial moments, the Faction voted against radicalism, rallying with the centrists. The Factionalists' extreme nationalism and antisemitism embarrassed most of the "Reds", who generally refrained from directly associating with the Faction outside of elections. The other side of the alliance was also avoiding any direct association. Seen as a purely "egotistic" force by its allies, the Faction always feared that the liberals were secretly "right-wing". As noted in 1886 by Alecu Holban, the Faction also viewed "Reds" as "counterfeit Jacobins", or as cosmopolitans whose stance was essentially "anti-national".

=== Senatorial vote and Concordia alliance ===
The core disputes of 1866 centered on the reestablishment of a Romanian Senate, with its implication of elitism. Hasdeu claimed at the time that "its maintenance costs us some millions a year, but provides us with no benefit, other than that it passes for a fine ornament and emanates a fragrance." Ionescu and Voinov proposed a number of successive projects, all of which were unicameral. While supporters of bicameralism insisted that the Senate would function as a Romanian House of Lords, the Factionalists and their allies ridiculed this claim when it came to |boyar nobility. Hasdeu wrote that, in Romania, "most of the old [boyar] families have gone extinct and were replaced by a make-believe aristocracy, newly born and lacking those glorious traditions which support English aristocrats; and on the other hand, most of our notabilities, political, literary and even parliamentary, have their roots in the mass of the people".

Faced with mounting support for bicameralism, Ionescu and Tacu conceded defeat but, alongside Christian Tell and Alexandru G. Golescu, still supported limiting the power of Senate to vote on the budget. However, they endorsed a bill which, if passed, would have given Senate the authority to try government ministers. Like various deputies on the left, they still resented the distribution of census suffrage, arguing that their bourgeois voters—portrayed by Ionescu's as a "third-estate" backbone of constitutionalism—were underrepresented in the 3rd Electoral College. Ionescu supported a two-college system and found it deplorable that, under the provisions for weighted voting, peasants had a 1:40,000 ratio of representation, and landowners a 1:40. The Faction, like the entire political class, rejected both universal suffrage and direct democracy, seeing Romanians, and peasants especially, as fundamentally immature for enfranchisement. However, Ionescu was upset by moves to outlaw all referendums, viewing regular consultation as an instrument of popular emancipation.

In October 1866, after difficult negotiations with the Sublime Porte, Carol also secured his international recognition, which relieved the need for consensus and allowed party politics to develop further. Following the election of November, in which Ionescu became a perennial deputy for Roman County, the legislature was split evenly between "Reds", "Whites", and a heterogeneous coalition of Cuza loyalists and Moldavian separatists; the parties of "the left", including the Faction, had some 20 deputy seats between them. During later contests for the new Senate seats, a more complex "Red" coalition emerged. Formalized as the Concordia Agreement in March 1867, it also included a group of moderates led by Kogălniceanu. However, as a Kogălniceanu rival, Ionescu never signed up to the Concordia platform, and his colleagues only adhered to some of its tenets. That year, Kogălniceanu spoke out more favorably of Moldavian demands, including against Holban: while the latter proposed a national coat of arms that would feature the Moldavian aurochs inescutcheon (and therefore inferior to the Wallachian eagle), Kogălniceanu noted that such symbolism evoked "some sort of humiliation".

Changing the configuration of Chamber, this alliance toppled Prime Minister Ghica, producing three successive radical cabinets, respectively headed by Constantin A. Kretzulescu, Ștefan Golescu, and Nicolae Golescu. These inaugurated investment in public works, modified electoral laws, and reduced the powers of the Senate. Support for Concordia divided the regional caucus: in May 1867, a crowd in Iași cheered Alecu Holban, who asked Moldavians to back the "truly liberal" Kretzulescu cabinet; Boldur-Lățescu was heckled for attempting to convince the public that they were being "cheated", and that the Court of Cassation was never going to be awarded to Iași.

Allocation of Chamber seats following the elections of 1867. Concordia: 68 seats Free and Independent Faction (as Concordia allies): 17 seats (estimate) Whites: 34 seats Moderates: 30 seats Independents: 8 seats

As Minister of Internal Affairs, "Red" doctrinaire Ion Brătianu worked to influence elections in favor the Concordia group, especially during December 1867. The new majority had some 85 seats in Chamber, of which some 14 were Factionalists—known to include Ionescu, Fătu, Gheorghiu, Alecu Holban, Lateș, Negură, Suciu, D. Tacu, Voinov, Ianache Lecca, Dumitru Lupașcu, Mantu Rufu, I. Strejescu, and Dumitru Țanu Vidrașcu. S. Vârnav, winner of the 4th-college seat for Tutova, died mysteriously before confirmation. His partisans claimed that he had been poisoned by Jews, sparking another antisemitic riot. The Faction was awarded the Chamber Presidency, held by Fătu, but remained suspicious of the "Reds".

=== Dreptatea and Factionalist regrouping ===
Marton described the staunch "ethnic protectionism" and "hysteric xenophobia" of both nationalist parties, including their claim that Jews were incapable of assimilating, as having ensured that the Constitution would only grant citizenship to Christians. Moreover, at Internal Affairs, Brătianu went against Carol's advice, ordering "severe measures against the Jews and foreign 'vagabonds'." Such policies were reportedly advocated, and imposed on him, by the Faction. During the interval, thirty-one deputies, Fătu included, presented a bill with exceptionally harsh antisemitic provisions, but this was defeated by an ad-hoc Chamber majority. At the time, Lateș also proposed to only grant Christians the "political right" of owning land; his bill was also defeated. The xenophobic stance was reportedly gaining momentum in Moldavia, with Factionalist professors expressing "aversion" toward Westernization, and purposefully ignoring "foreign literature and art". Their protectionism blended with natalism in another proposal, advanced at one time by Suciu, which would have overtaxed bachelors.

From May 1867 to October 1870, in times of "maximum political strife", Ionescu put out the Factionalist newspaper Dreptatea ("Justice" or "Fairness"). As outlined here, the ideology of Factionalism also comprised fringe positions, including criticism of Christianity—Ionescu viewed Christianity as a worthy state religion, and conversion to it as a prerequisite of citizenship, but argued that the Romanian Orthodox Church was too indebted to Judaism and "the Greeks". Alongside the promise of full land reform, Moldavian regionalism resurfaced as communalism: the Faction believed that the executive should be closely monitored by the Chamber, and stood by the notion that communes were autonomous units of the state. On this point, Factionalists were irreconcilable with the "Reds", who favored quick centralization and a unitary state.

During July 1867, a group of Moldavian deputies issued an appeal for organizing a regional caucus to defend regional interests; signatories included Prefect Sturdza, alongside his former enemies Ceaur-Aslan and Iamandi, as well as Grigore Balș, Panait Balș, Grigore Vârnav, and Colonel Pavlov. This initiative was censured by "Red" centralists, whose letter of response noted that regional divides were unconstitutional. From September, the Tăutu brothers began printing Bacău's first regular newspaper, D̦iorile ("The Dawn"). Identified as a Factionalist venue, it was accused by other liberals of wanting to "divide the country into satrapies". Also at the time, Boldur-Lățescu and Nicolae Rosetti-Rosnovanu began putting out their own newspaper, Moldova, which included such pronouncements as: "Wallachians are the Moldavians' eternal and natural enemies". This openly separatist group always maintained strong links with Ceaur-Aslan and Voinov.

Despite maintaining such principles, and although the Faction voted against development loans from the Oppenheim family, Ionescu also supported the common nationalist agenda, favoring a national currency and the construction of a centralized transport infrastructure. Beyond its advocacy of xenophobic restrictions, the Faction also viewed itself as a watchdog for individual freedoms, and lauded the introduction of jury trials as a testing ground for extended suffrage. Ionescu in particular favored a focus on civics, rather than vocational education, in the state-funded primary schools. From March 1868, Ionescu and Ianache Lecca were also instrumental in reforming the nationwide Civic Guard, which acted as a reserve and police force. Their project called for the Guard to no longer be a paramilitary wing of the "Red" caucus, and become a more reliable Landwehr.

Brătianu confirmed Ionescu's suspicions in April 1868, when he canvassed direct support for the "Reds" at Iași. His trip was a disappointment, drawing a mob which protested violently against his schemes. In the July 1868 race, Ionescu took a seat in the Senate, where he remained until 1870. His leaving the Factionalist leadership in Chamber was deplored as a major loss by his replacement, Gheorghiu. However, the Faction still dominated Moldavian politics, enlisting affiliations from the moderate liberal Gheorghe Mârzescu and from urban professionals, variously including Dimitrie Anghel (father of the poet), Scarlat Pastia, Miltiade Tzony, and Ștefan Micle. Before 1868, it also had the support of Ion Creangă, a rebellious priest and aspiring writer who attended electoral meetings and Faction primaries. It was during these that Creangă clashed with the local "White" orator, Iacob Negruzzi.

=== Junimea and "White" consolidation ===
Iași was by then home to a cultural and political club, called Junimea, which soon presented a structured opposition to both Ionescu's group, and, from 1870, a distinct branch of the "White" movement; it was able to attract within its ranks some of the junior Factionalists, including Creangă, Panu, and Xenopol, as well as conservatives such as Negruzzi. Junimea's Wallachian founder, Titu Maiorescu, published essays directly attacking the cornerstones of Bărnuțiu's politics, and Romanian liberalism as a whole, from the implicit position of liberal conservatism. In particular, he rejected the Faction's ideas on land reform as "communistic", expressing his astonishment that an anti-state party had been allowed to govern at all. Maiorescu's friend Petre P. Carp also attacked Factionalism through his newspaper, Térra, which declared itself the voice of true liberalism in its constitutionalist, monarchist, version. Especially through Carp, Junimism condemned the Faction's xenophobia, and called for the protection of Romanian Jews; Maiorescu also described Ionescu's party as "ephemeral", defined by its "hatred of foreigners, and in particular Jews."

The Factionalists took notice of such reactions, and the conflict between them and the Junimists became exceptionally bitter—the two camps were deadly enemies to one another. Factionalist propaganda portrayed the Junimists as "Freemasons" and as "hirelings" of the external enemies. This political dispute highlighted earlier rivalries, which began in 1864, when Maiorescu and Ionescu accused each other of adultery. Factionalists Suciu and Cobălcescu had also lodged a legal complaint against Maiorescu, claiming, spuriously so, that he lacked Romanian citizenship and was therefore ineligible for political office. On the Junimist side, the response was provided by Negruzzi, who published number of pamphlets depicting Ionescu and the Factionalists as irrational demagogues. Junimea also kept a record of "inanities" published in the Factionalist newspapers.

The "Red" series in government ended in November 1868, when Carol, troubled by the excesses of antisemitism, began selecting his ministers from the moderate right. Carol also apologized for the sufferings of his Jewish subjects, which led the Faction to issue a protest; its senators also voted against the N. Golescu government when it did the same. Ionescu supported Golescu and Brătianu's definition of the Jews as "vagabonds", but declared his disappointment at their moderation. As noted at the time by Carp, Brătianu was shying away from official antisemitism, and only instrumenting it through "anarchy" and "the rabble in the streets"; the Faction, he argued, was at least consistent in seeking out a legal method.

The Concordia alliance crumbled before the election of March 1869, with Kogălniceanu, who resented the Golescus' external policies, joining Dimitrie Ghica's ministry. The election itself was a sound defeat for the left: the "Reds" took 10 seats in Chamber and the Faction only 8, with the moderates and "Whites" sharing 120. However, there were widespread reports and complaints that Kogălniceanu had advised local authorities to condone fraud and to intimidate the opposition. According to several accounts, including his own, the defector Mârzescu, serving as Prefect of Iași County, personally ensured that Kogălniceanu won a deputy's seat against Ionescu. Mârzescu reports that he sided with Carp and the "intelligent dynastic youth" against Ionescu, and that the elections were free of interference—which is why the Factionalists had lost. He writes: "not one Factionalist was even elected; and in the evening of election day the Factionalists gathering at Borta Rece [tavern] calculated the difference in votes, and consoled themselves in that their loss was not shameful, since their ratio of votes was 2 to 5."

In early 1870, a new majority of moderates was formed around D. Ghica and Manolache Epureanu—calling themselves the "Party of Order"—, with the adherence of Efrem Ghermani and Cezar Bolliac. According to Hasdeu, this was a "broth of boyars and democrats", existing only to keep "the Reds and the Faction" out of office. Hasdeu also accused Epureanu of wanting to naturalize and introduce Jews into the country, under the guise of constitutionalism: "So the Constitution will appear to be standing, although trampled upon by the Jews." He called for an antisemitic unification—of liberals, radicals and nationalists—into a "great party of action", "purified of all things bastard, all things cosmopolitan".

== As a third party ==
=== Republican surge ===
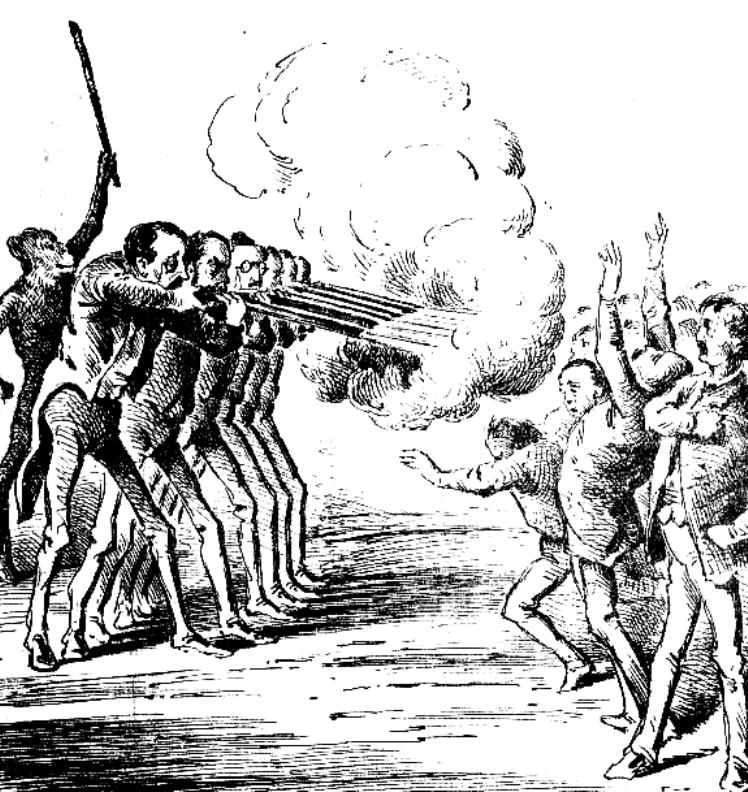
June 1870 caricature in the "Red" gazette Ghimpele, showing the Epureanu cabinet (including Petre P. Carp) shooting down protesters in Pitești; the gibbon "Scarlat", a stand-in for Carol I, is depicted as ordering the alleged atrocity

As noted by historian Silvia Marton, the marginalized "Reds" first began talking of republicanism in the early months of 1869—"chipping away at Carol's strength and authority" despite their setbacks. While Ionescu attended official functions honoring the Domnitor well into 1869, the Faction discarded its early project for a native dynasty (which it now deemed "the imperialistic regime") and embraced republicanism. Nevertheless, Factionalist deputies such as Ion Codrescu still expressed a hope that the throne could stand for "the country as a whole", and reaffirmed their conditional support for Carol. As reported by Gazet'a Transilvaniei in early 1869, republicanism remained "of little value in Europe"; the only journal to match the Factionalist platform outside Moldavia was Emanoil Quinezu's Electorulu Craiovei, which exercised some influence in Oltenia.

A republican drift was accentuated during the elections of May 1870. These were entirely manufactured by Carol, who was arguably overstepping constitutional bounds. They took place in a climate of violence and uncertainty, with riots in Bucharest, Giurgiu, and Pitești. In his editorial of June 3, Hasdeu called Epureanu a "butcher", but warned that "a nation is like iron: the more you strike at it, the more it will harden." Epureanu managed to set up a "Hen and Fledgling Cabinet" that included Junimist Carp at Foreign Affairs. This was an early sign of the success of anti-Factionalism in Moldavia, where Junimea was growing into a political movement. The election, however, produced 34 deputies who, according to Hasdeu, stood for the "independent current, whose banner, the one it raised only yesterday, has managed to overwhelm with its vigor the authoritarian school." Alongside Ionescu, I. Codrescu, Fătu, Gheorghiu, Alecu Holban, Negură, Suciu, Voinov, and Tacu, these were: Stroe Belloescu, Constantin Bosianu, Alexandru Lăzărescu-Laerțiu, Gheorghe Lecca, Costache Negri, Nicolae Gr. Racoviță, Nicolae Rosetti-Bălănescu, George D. Vernescu, I. Adrian, Ion Agarici, N. Bossie, Costin Brăescu, D. Comănăsceanu, Leon Eraclide, E. Filipescu, I. Gâlcă, Matei Ganea, P. Georgiade, Vasile Holban, Dumitru Lupașcu, George P. Mantu, L. Moldoveanu, Constantin Scafesu, George Sefendache, G. Vucenicu.

This count may include "Red" sympathizers: according to Marton, the Faction only had 25 deputies, and the "Reds" 32—at 57 seats, their alliance actually had a slim majority; government was backed by neutral "Whites", and by a slim majority of senators. Marton also includes Gheorghe Chițu in her count of 1870 Factionalists. Overall, the caucus of various liberal groups and tendencies was especially weak, ridiculed by outsiders as a "perfectly undecided" legislature. Of those included in Hasdeu's count, Sefendache moved between the "Reds" and the Factionalists, and had crucially sided with the "Party of Order" during the 1869–1870 legislature.

In Chamber, Voinov had verbal duels with moderates such as Constantin Boerescu over suspicions of electoral fraud by political bosses. During such bouts, he insisted that the Civic Guard had moral a duty to "rise up and protect" the people. There were other calls for a revolution in Wallachia, all sparked by popular support for the French Empire during the Franco-Prussian War—while Carol and some of his ministers favored the German coalition. In radical circles, despite an awareness that France was under an illiberal regime, the war was depicted as a struggle "between freedom and despotism." After some reluctance, with Ionescu noting that nobody in Europe cared about Romania's positioning, the Francophile tenets were also taken up by the Factionalists. In Chamber, Ionescu and Gheorghiu spoke against neutrality, asking Epureanu and Carp to at least express moral sympathy for France, and proposing that Chamber be put in control of foreign policies.

By August, Wallachian radicals became involved in the incident known as "Republic of Ploiești", which ended in a police round-up of prominent "Reds". Several were tried for sedition, but acquitted by a sympathetic jury. Dreptatea condemned the "ridiculous rebellion", arguing that its instigators were inconsistent democrats, and dwelling on the older critique of Wallachian centralism; the "republic", Ionescu theorized, would only have reinforced the subjugation of Moldavian communes, while also imposing a one-party regime. This denunciation, Marton notes, was possibly prompted by fear of prosecution—in Chamber, Negură and Ionescu pushed through a declaration that denounced sedition, but also proclaimed their support for democratic change and for more parliamentary control. In addition, Ionescu expressed solidarity with the chief conspirator, Alexandru Candiano-Popescu. Interrogated by the authorities in August 1870, Hasdeu denied his involvement in the conspiracy, while also distancing himself from the "Reds" and calling himself a member of the Faction. Hasdeu also reported that Factionalist doctrines meant a "governance always and everywhere Romanian, and on the basis of democracy."

=== "Strousberg Affair" and reactions to it ===
The Faction announced its alternative program to devolve the country into an elective monarchy, as a necessary transition to full republicanism. The resulting dispute led to a motion of no confidence, and Epureanu was deposed. This marked Ion Ghica's return as Prime Minister, a temporary arrangement which seemed to satisfy both the "Reds" and the Faction. Faced with mounting opposition, Carol threatened to resign, and another conspiracy, headed by Eugeniu Carada, prepared to take over government; the status quo was preserved only after Brătianu asked Carada to rescind. The "Reds" reverted to an earlier stance, and endorsed Carol as the legitimate Domnitor; Ionescu and the Faction agitated for the election of a Romanian monarch, but superficially endorsed legalism, and recognized Carol as a legitimate ruler.

The period was also marked by another controversy, called "Strousberg Affair", which tarnished the early history of Romanian railways, rekindled xenophobia, and endangered Romania's relations with the German Empire. This scandal emerged from laws that the Faction had approved of or abstained on. Although Lăzărescu-Laerțiu was an early opponent of the deal, Gheorghiu was seen by the left-nationalist paper Ghimpele as endorsing railways "no matter how" they were purchased. Ghimpele attacked the Faction's antisemitism as hypocritical, since they now accepted Jewish investments and even Moldavia's settlement by "Jewish thistles".

The resulting fiasco was popularly attributed to German and Jewish scheming. Following the anti-German riot at Casa Capșa, which he blamed on poor crowd control, Carol ordered Ghica's cabinet to resign. After again threatening to abdicate, he eventually settled on creating a "White" cabinet under Lascăr Catargiu. The situation upset Factionalist deputies. During renewed agitation in January 1871, Ionescu had openly celebrated Carol's decision to leave—an irresponsible attitude, according to his ally Brătianu. Alongside their "Red" colleague Nicolae Fleva, Ionescu, Gheorghiu and Codrescu alleged that Catargiu was being forced on them by the Romanian military, and more discreetly by Germany. In March, Alecu Holban, who led a parliamentary inquiry, intimated that Carol was legally answerable for having appointed adventurer Otto Victor Ambronn as a manager of the Romanian holdings in the Strousberg venture.

In April, Carol and Foreign Minister Gheorghe Costaforu traveled to Moldavia, contacting the monarchist circles, in particular Junimea. As noted by political historian Apostol Stan, Junimism was sponsored by Catargiu precisely because it would help "contain the spread of ideas upheld by the Free and Independent Faction". At the time, arch-conservatives and some of their Junimist backers caused a stir with their endorsement of Grigore Sturdza's bills to amend the constitution. These proposed a stricter limitation of suffrage, the screening of senators by the Domnitor, the death penalty for murder, and curbs on press freedom. More controversially, Sturdza and his allies also favored opening the country to German colonists. These proposals went unanswered, with Ionescu and Kogălniceanu threatening a revolt of the people. References to "national glory" and the importance of Orthodoxy were enforced in the art conservation bill of February 1871. It was sponsored by Factionalists Ionescu, Mantu, Negri and Vucenicu, but also by Bolliac and V. A. Urechia.

Despite such resistance, the conservative trend was consolidated in the May 1871 election. The opposition was again coalesced: the Factionalists, the "Reds", and Kogălniceanu all stood for the "convened liberal party" or "the left"; nevertheless, the "Whites" had a solid win. It inaugurated five years of conservative government, with Catargiu as Prime Minister, while conspiratorial republicans, including Brătianu and C. A. Rosetti, failed to win seats. Speaking for the far-left opposition, Hasdeu claimed that the election had been rigged, since intellectuals and aristocrats such as Maiorescu and Sturdza had been elected by peasant voters in the 4th College.

=== Catagiu's hold on power ===
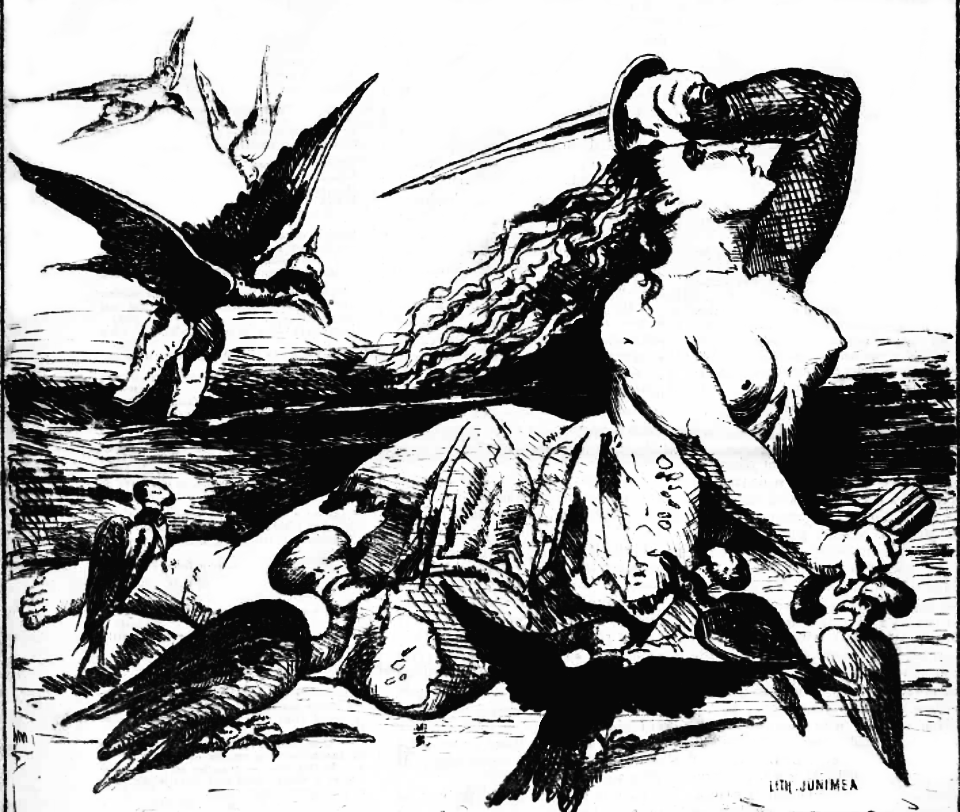
April 1874 cartoon in the "Red" magazine Asmodeu: Romania as a young warrior, stripped down by boyar raptors and the Prussian eagle

Catargiu's administration brought the "routinization of political conflict", which, although violent in tone, remained mindful of constitutional arrangements. It also witnessed the peak of reciprocal attacks between Junimea and the Faction: as deputy, and then as Education Minister, Maiorescu began investigating the politicization of higher learning, and in particular the work of Ionescu and other Factionalists at Iași University. Such measures prompted Cobălcescu, who represented the university, to resign from Senate. However, both Maiorescu and Ionescu were incensed when a "White" minister, Christian Tell, forced provincial academics to choose between their chairs and their deputy seats in Bucharest.

In 1871–1874, the dispute between Ionescu and Maiorescu focused on the rural communes, their administration and economy. The new law of 1874 imposed centralization, allowing government to select mayors from a pool of elected councilors. In his interventions, Ionescu supported communal autonomy as the basis for democratic self-government. Instead, Maiorescu noted that the democratic experiment had only created frail institutions, and proposed to curb this with "feudalism", by giving rich landowners over-representation in communal councils. In parallel, at Iași, Alecu Holban, Tacu and the Corjescus mounted the opposition against a Junimist communal administration, headed by Mayor Nicolae Gane and Prefect Leon C. Negruzzi (Iacob's brother). As Ceaur-Aslan lost an auction to pave the city streets, a Factionalist newspaper, Uniunea Liberală ("Liberal Union"), claimed that Gane's public works were a graft from the Catargiu spoils system. In November 1872, Gane and Alecu Holban almost dueled over the insinuations.

Ionescu was also highly critical of the Conservative laws on labor contracts, arguing that hired hands had been stripped of all means to pressure their landowning employers. By then, Maiorescu also took a more protectionist stance than Sturdza, Costaforu, and Factionalists such as Ceaur-Aslan, demanding that foreign investors be barred from buying land in Romania for a period of ten years; his opponents only demanded a two-year term. Ionescu, for his part, supported the establishment of native credit unions with the introduction of unrestricted capitalism, and spoke out against state monopolies for tobacco and alcohol.

From early 1871, the "Reds" began talks of fusion with the Factionalists and with all other liberal clubs. The cause was popularized by the two new Factionalist organs: Uniunea Liberală and Gazeta de Bacău ("Bacău Gazette"). Members of both groups organized the ostentatious funeral of Domnitor Cuza in May 1873. Ionescu delivered the funeral oration; the burial at Ruginoasa was overseen by a National Committee, whose members included Anghel, Fătu, Pastia, Poni, Tacu, Șendrea and Suciu. This ceremony allowed the "Reds" to obscure their participation in the 1866 coup and reemerge as legatees of the Cuza regime.

As reported later by Alecu Holban, by 1874 the Faction had returned to its conspiratorial dealings, again promoting Dabija as Carol's would-be usurper; the planned coup was masterminded by Mârzescu, now recognized as a Factionalist leader, behind Ionescu. Eventually, it also obtained support from "Red" leaders, including Brătianu and Dimitrie Sturdza (both of whom visited Dabija in Iași), as well as from General Alexandru Cernat, Kogălniceanu, and Telemac Ciupercescu. At the time, the radicals and the Moldavian localists were also publicly associated with one another. Based in Bolgrad County, where he put out the newspaper Flagelulŭ in 1873, Boldur-Lățescu expressed his support for the republican agenda and a unified opposition caucus. In August 1874, political journalist Scipione "Bagyai" Bădescu referred to the Faction as to an "extremity of the red party", though still counting it as one of five distinct parties, separate from other liberals.

=== "Mozhar Pasha" and signs of disintegration ===
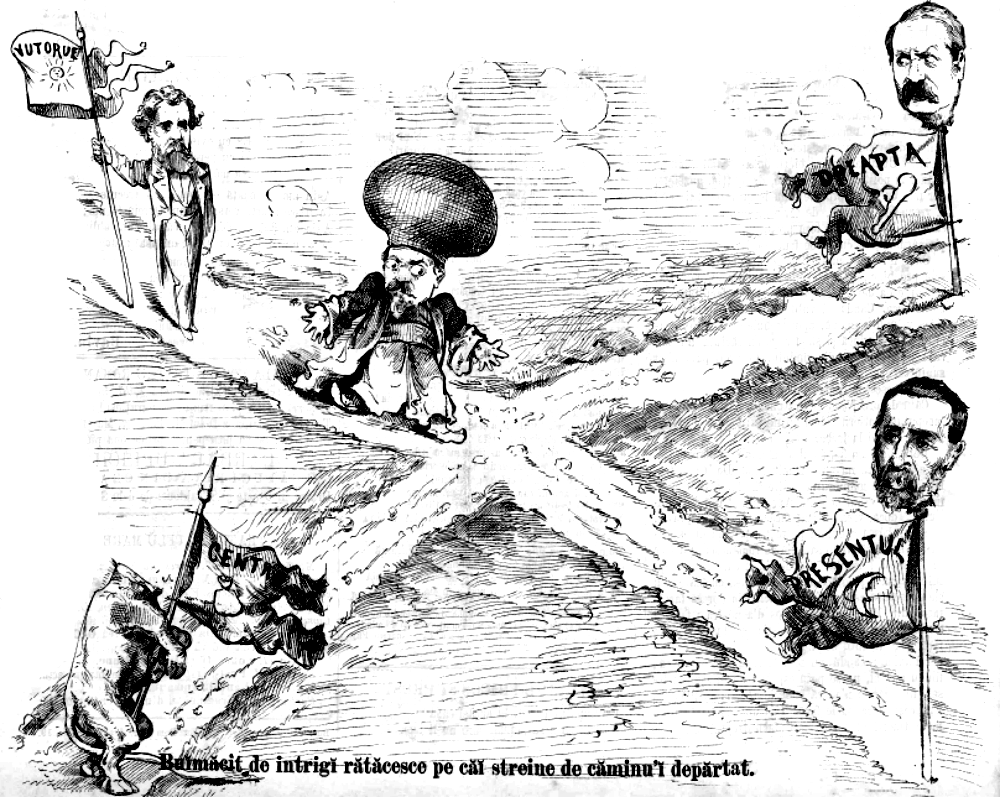
Ghimpele cartoon of March 1877, showing Mihail Kogălniceanu undecided between the political camps of Ion Brătianu, Lascăr Catargiu, and Ion Ghica. Bottom left is the "Center", depicted as a headless calf ready for purchase

The merger negotiations took years: a definitive alliance, also known as the coalition of "Mozhar Pasha", only transformed itself into the National Liberal Party (PNL) in 1875 or after. According to some accounts, the Faction as a whole joined the coalition, but not the party. In July 1875, Iași's National Liberal Party Committee had among its members Alecu Holban, Ionescu, Șendrea, Tacu, Tzony, Anghel, Ciupercescu, Cobălcescu, Gheorghian, Gheorghiu, Pastia and Negură. Over the following months, some prominent Factionalists or former separatists, including Boldur-Lățescu, C. Corjescu, Sefendache, and Mantu Rufu, openly announced that they were joining the consolidated group as regular members. Other sources suggest that both the urban and rural chapters of the Faction were now "folded into the bosom of the Liberal Party". Rosetti himself was bitter about this rapprochement, noting that the Faction, alongside a liberal current led by George D. Vernescu, reaped all the benefits of the alliance, without enduring any consequence.

The elections of that year created an understanding between Epureanu's "independent conservative" faction and Brătianu, allowing them to govern together. In the electoral sweep of June 1876, at least 18 Factionalists, including Ionescu, took seats as PNL deputies (other estimates suggest that between 15 and 26 deputies were Faction affiliates). The PNL's secure victory, and a subsequent rapprochement with Carol, toned down republicanism, which was only expressed by dissenters such as Rosetti and Carada. Dabija's conspiracy also fell apart immediately after Carol agreed to designate Brătianu his Prime Minister, though the Factionalists were still strong at Iași—taking two out of three in-play colleges during the local elections in October. As leader of the Faction, his name absent from the cabinet proposal, Ionescu also continued to voice the old credo, insisting that the republic was "the most liberal, most democratic, most perfect" regime. However, he sent out conciliatory messages to Carol, assuring him that the Faction did not seek to have him appear in court over accusations of corruption. Against the changing consensus, he also defended alleged perpetrators of antisemitic violence.

With Brătianu in charge of government, Ionescu himself served briefly as Vice President of Chamber, under Rosetti. This signaled problems between him and other Factionalists, most of whom opposed Rosetti's policies, preferring to align themselves with Epureanu's followers. Following a government reshuffle, during which the moderates again withdrew and the Faction became an important partner in government, Ionescu was appointed Foreign Minister. The younger Factionalist, Ștefan C. Șendrea, was one of his trusted secretaries. Their policy still differed from the PNL's: Ionescu did not look favorably on the project to shed Ottoman suzerainty, and felt that Romania should declare herself a neutral country. Since the guarantees of the Treaty of Paris would have been voided by independence, he feared that the country would end up under a foreign occupation, and was especially troubled by any empowerment of the Russian Empire. During his time in office, Ionescu also toned down his own protectionism. He supported fixed tariffs against Kogălniceanu's free-trade agenda, but argued that import substitution industrialization generated "bad, overpriced merchandise"; by 1877, he endorsed reciprocal free-trade agreements with the major exporters of Western Europe. In other areas, the Faction took the initiative for asserting Romanian autonomy. By December 1876, Factionalist deputies, led by Andrei Vizanti, submitted a project to set up the National Bank of Romania. The motion, criticized in the press as amateurish, was eventually defeated in that form.

This period in government preceded the Faction's ultimate downfall. Now identified as one of the "center-left" parliamentary leaders, Ionescu parted with the Faction during his tenure, leaving his Moldavian colleagues in Chamber as an unaffiliated group. As early as 1875, Ceaur-Aslan had joined G. Sturdza's branch of the "White" caucus in Iași, though opposing from within the ascendancy of Junimist cadres. In February 1877, Kogălniceanu, Vernescu and other moderates withdrew from the embryonic PNL, leaving it to be taken over by the "Reds"; the Faction remained aligned with the "Mozhar Pasha" group. Its list of adversaries included, from April, a Moderate Liberal Party—formed in Moldavia by Kogălniceanu and Mârzescu, alongside Ciupercescu, Eugeniu Alcaz, and Vasile Conta. Also antisemitic, this new group saw itself as a morally superior alternative on the left, specifically designed to replace the Faction.

Kogălniceanu in particular criticized Ionescu's performance at Foreign Affairs, accusing him of incompetence and of wasting government resources on the Factionalist political machine; he called on Brătianu to renounce his alliance with Ionescu's "insignificant liberal group". He achieved this goal the same month, when he himself took up the position of Foreign Minister. Other Factionalists continued to serve in more minor positions. Gheorghian was Prefect of Iași County, but was constantly pressured by the Moderate Liberals into resigning. Holding a similar position in Covurlui County, Vasile Holban was denounced by prosecutor N. Moscachi of running a dictatorial administration to "satisfy the interests" of his more famous relative, Alecu. The latter's career was explored by Kogălniceanu and Cobălcescu's newspaper, Steaua României, who alleged that Factionalist control over the Iași council had seen Jews turned into regular tax collectors, who were dependent on Holban's whims and paid him protection fees. The "Whites" similarly regarded Factionalist rule as disastrous, noting that adherents of that group had created a spoils system: those who rented from the state were granted rebates; others made fortunes as "middlemen between the state and the Jews".

=== 1878–1879 crisis ===
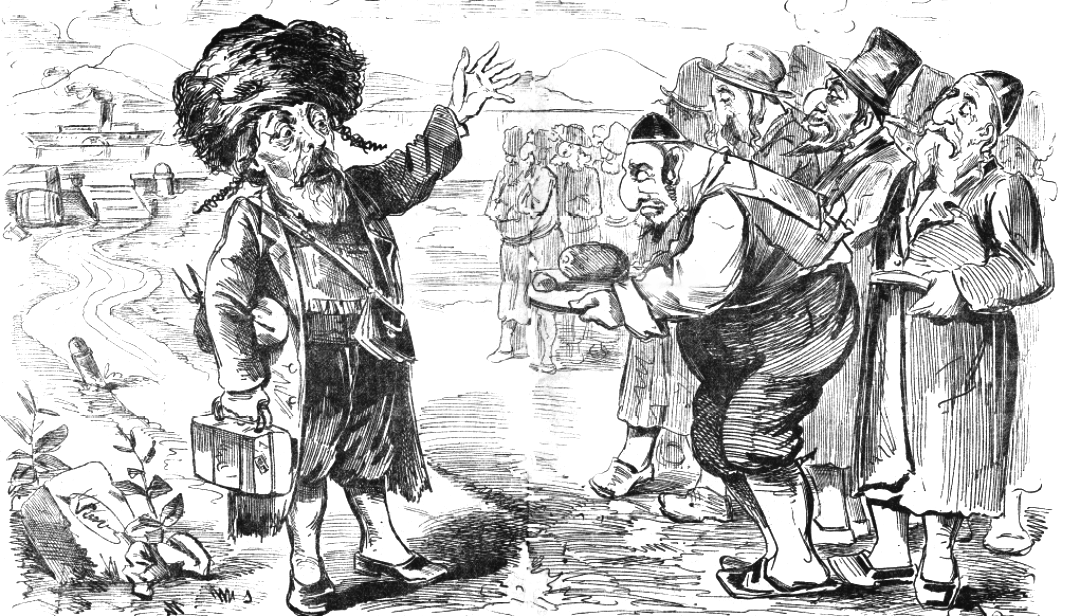
Antisemitic cartoon published in Bobârnacul after the Congress of Berlin. It shows C. A. Rosetti, in shtreimel, kaftan and payot, as a patron of the Jews

Managed by Brătianu and Kogălniceanu, and under a temporary truce between the PNL and the "Whites", the country pursued her independence, entering the Russo–Turkish War. On May 9, 1877, as Kogălniceanu proclaimed national sovereignty, Ionescu was one of two deputies to abstain. As a Factionalist senator, Voinov voted against independence. However, other Factionalists, including Vizanti and Tzony, enlisted for service in the Civic Guard of Iași, training alongside adversaries such as Carp, Maiorescu, and Pogor. During the war, Ionescu resumed his campaigning for a more liberal regime for land-and-labor disputes. He and Vizanti proposed state regulations of contracts between landowners and peasants, as well as a continued system of land distribution from state property to landless veterans.

By February 1878, various Factionalists were questioning Ionescu's authority, and considering a merger with either the PNL or the Moderate Liberals. The PNL "Reds" were again nominally allied with the Faction, pushing aside Kogălniceanu—the latter's party sided instead with a Conservative-Liberal group, headed by the old anti-Factionalist G. Sturdza. It also took up the cause of decentralization, while proposing generic protectionism. During the election of April, the PNL list in Iași was headlined by the former Junimist Vasile Alecsandri, with Fătu, Gheorghian, Gheorghiu, Alecu Holban, Pastia, and A. Șendrea among the lesser candidates; Junimea and the Conta–Mârzescu–Ciupercescu group ran on the Conservative-Liberal ticket.

The resulting Chamber only had four or five members not affiliated or allied with the PNL. However, the Faction was in the process of forming the parliamentary opposition. As Minister of the Interior, C. A. Rosetti visited Iași and met with the Factionalist leaders at România Hotel. Fearful of not losing electoral power and hence offices, they vetoed Rosetti's plan to rewrite the constitution. The group restated its belief in regional autonomy, while returning to strongly anti-German and antisemitic language. Ionescu and Alecu Holban staged a renewed effort to have Maiorescu removed from Parliament, this time by citing his appreciation for the philosophical works of Arthur Schopenhauer. Ionescu staged a "trial" of Schopenhauer in Iași; Holban, referring to himself as the voice of a "national, democratic, and liberal party", declared Schopenhauer and Maiorescu as standing for "materialism [...], concubinage, the right of beating people with a whip, contempt for patriotic love and for sentiments of honor."

The debates over antisemitism were soon rekindled by the Congress of Berlin, which asked Romania to naturalize its Jews. The PNL divided itself over the issue, with Alecsandri claiming that the Congress would establish a "new Palestine" in Moldavia. Such quarrels left the Factionalists with an opportunity to recapture of the nationalist vote. However, they found themselves unable to compete with a younger category of antisemitic activists, rallied by Conta. Speaking in October 1878, Alecu Holban noted being "honored to belong [...] to that group which is dubbed a faction, namely the group of free and independent constitutionalists." He and his colleagues, Holban claimed, were not in a rush to see the Jews emancipated: "when things are normal both at home at abroad—that's when we are to solve the constitutional, social issues." Tzony took a moderate position, advocating citizenship rights for Jewish war veterans and, "in due time", emancipation for the community as a whole. Ionescu meanwhile objected to the liberalization of citizenship laws, describing the process as a "stain on modern Romanian society", and calling Prime Minister Brătianu a "sold-over to the Israelites". While Rosetti and his Românul advocated a compromise, Ionescu and Vernescu proposed defying the international consensus, even at the risk of Romanian independence not being recognized; they only recommended naturalizing those Jews "who will ask us to".

During the Iași by-elections of November 1878, Factionalists were soundly defeated by the Moderates at Iași—only Pastia was able to win a 3rd-College seat, which he won by a difference of 3 or 4 votes. Consequently, Factionalist clubs opened up to the right-wing opposition. In Brătianu's own words, the PNL was facing the prospect of a new cabinet being formed by "White gentlemen, the Senate opposition, two Factionalists, and two more men I would not know how to describe"; he reacted by calling for new elections in 1879. The Factionalists then endorsed Catargiu's catch-all Conservative Party, and ran on a common list. They stood for naturalization on a case-by-case basis, while the PNL had settled on granting citizenship to all upper-class Jews. Their alliance was defeated, obtaining only 15 seats in Chamber; a full merger between the two parties was not attempted, with the Conservatives noting that they "needed no such grafting." Conservatives and Factionalists were still able to work together in their project for constitutional revision, which resulted in their naturalization principle emerging as triumphant. As one of the participants in this effort, Conservative Pavel Gorgos argues that the Faction had effectively ended its political existence upon reaching this core objective.

=== Final splits ===
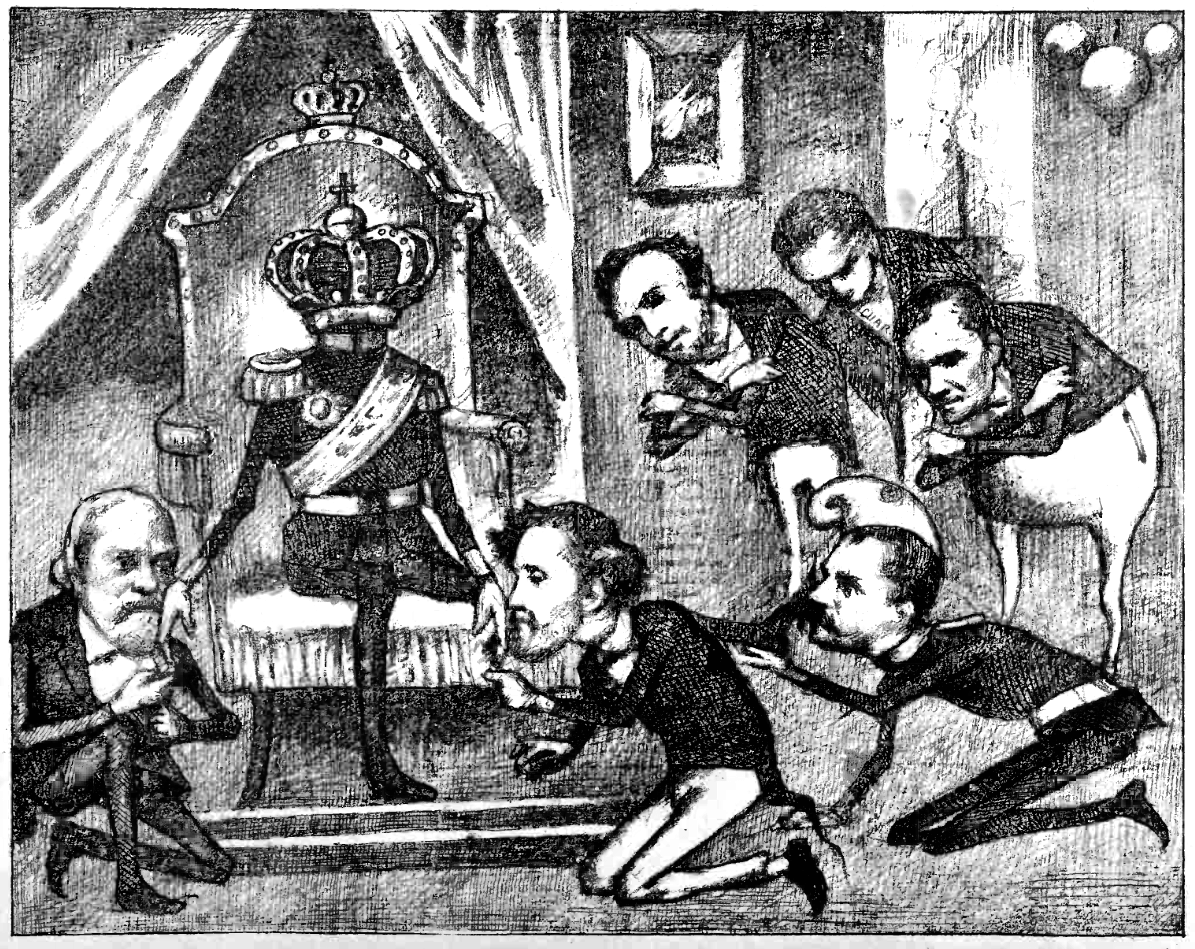
Critique of the monarchy from the conservative right, in an 1885 issue of Ciulinul: former "Republic of Ploiești" conspirators groveling before Carol

By January 1880, with most of the Moderate Liberals absorbed into the PNL, Ionescu and some who had debuted with the Faction, including Ștefan Șendrea, joined Vernescu's own Sincere Liberal Party, which sought to reclaim the middle-class vote. Ionescu was for a while a member of the Central Committee of that party, which was sometimes referred to as the "Vernescu–Ionescu liberal faction". According to seething diary entries by Domnitor Carol, in 1881 Catargiu, Vernescu and Ionescu had formed "something like a party", and were filibustering in Chamber against PNL laws. From March 1880, the surviving Factionalists, or "independent liberals", rallied around a new daily newspaper called Mișcarea Națională ("National Movement"). It was managed by Tacu and his younger disciple, Constantin "Coco" Dimitrescu-Iași, and espoused strongly anti-government sentiments, being critical of Brătianu's "Byzantinism".

Although allied with Vernescu against the PNL, the Faction remained an independent group in the 1880 legislature, with Alecu Holban serving as deputy for Vaslui County. Still a prominent antisemite, Ceaur-Aslan was returned to Chamber in the Iași by-elections of 1881. Allied with Rosetti, Ionescu was unable to make the constitution itself more liberal, but, in 1882, managed to reform the labor contracts. One news item from January 1881 refers to Ionescu as the leader of a distinct group, of "moderate liberals from across the Milcov". Its other noted members were Alecu Holban, Vizanti, Voinov, and Sandu Miclescu; its allies in Bucharest were the editorial staff of Binele Public gazette, including Emanoil Protopopescu-Pake and G. Dem. Teodorescu. This Moldavian-based coalition was attached to Vernescu's: in early 1883, when democratization amendments were proposed, senators Voinov and Ștefan Șendrea, listed as "Sincere Liberals", voted in support of them.

By then, Ionescu had renounced the cause of republicanism, backing the Kingdom of Romania upon its proclamation in May 1881. He was also warning against anti-state agitation by the socialists and foreign "Nihilists", while rejecting a PNL project to place all radicals under police supervision. Ionescu also distinguished between liberal and extreme socialists, arguing that the former should be granted full liberty to organize. This stance was not shared by other politicians of the Factionalist tradition. In socialist circles, Alecu Holban and Tzony were known for participating in the crackdown against Moldavian socialism: allegedly, they engineered the persecution of Nikolai Sudzilovsky, Theodor Speranția, and Ioan Nădejde. The Factionalist group survived at Iași, and, during local elections in January 1883, proposed a list that included (in descending order) Pastia, Teodor Tăutu, A. Șendrea, Tacu, Anghel, and Ștefan Emilian. In June of that year, Carol, now King of Romania, visited Iași, with the old Factionalist allies Cernat, Chițu and Hasdeu at his side; the banquet was attended by Voinov.

From 1880, the PNL chapters in Moldavia had begun a focused campaign to "coerce [the Faction] into merging with the National Liberal party." As a sign of this rapprochement, in 1882 several old Factionalist parliamentarians, including Ionescu, supported measures to fold the Civic Guard into the regular army. PNL recruitment was resisted by more conservative Factionalists ahead of the 1883 national campaign; they supported Kogălniceanu's effort to establish another national third party, called Unified Opposition Committees. Ionescu was also drawn into this alliance: during the January 1886 by-elections of Putna County, he joined Kogălniceanu in canvassing votes for the opposition candidates. In early 1887, this Iași-centered movement was headed by Alecu C. Mavrocordat. Its affiliates included the Corjescus, Anghel, Ceaur-Aslan, Iamandi, Mârzescu and Tzony, alongside young leftists such as Alexandru Bădărău and George Panu.

Before the election of 1884, Tacu, Ștefan Șendrea, Gheorghiu and their colleagues had left the Faction to take up PNL seats in Chamber, being criticized by the anti-Brătianu camp for their quick transformation into disciplined party cadres. Voinov followed suit, and had a stint as Justice Minister. By June 1884, he had lost the support of liberal youths, including those of Western Moldavia, who called on him to resign and be replaced by a PNL eminence, Anastase Stolojan. According to Conservative reports, in 1887 the Faction still existed as a distinct chapter within the PNL "collective", kept alive by the spoils system and working to "falsify public opinion" on the side of the PNL. The Opposition Committees mounted the anti-PNL campaign in preparation for the January 1888 election, forming the Iași League of Resistance. In addition to the older affiliates of the Committees, League members included Alecu Holban and Pogor. Mârzescu voiced the group's criticism of Carol whom he accused of validating PNL-ist corruption. Also in 1887, remnants of the Faction heckled Carol as he returned for a visit to Iași.

== Legacy ==
=== Post-Faction Factionalism ===
Ionescu still held a deputy's seat at Roman in 1884, returning to Chamber for a final term in the October 1888 election, but at Iași. His Sincere Liberals continued to exist, absorbing remnants of the Moderate Liberal Party. Ionescu was also returning to his anti-Carol stance, objecting to the creation of Crown Estates under Ioan Kalinderu, and defending Tzony when the latter was indicted for lèse-majesté. He also proposed limited electoral reform by inducting more peasant voters. In early 1889, Ionescu became an unaffiliated deputy, though loosely associated with Panu and Bădărău's Radical Party. Ceaur-Aslan also returned as Iași deputy. Having campaigned on a left-wing platform that drew votes from the socialists, he turned again to antisemitism by asking for a parliamentary committee to report on the "Jewish Question".

Ceaur-Aslan and Ionescu mounted the opposition against a Junimist cabinet under Theodor Rosetti, who proposed a limited land reform to calm peasant uprisings in Ilfov County. As such, in March 1889 they were the only two of 139 deputies to vote against the law, with Ceaur-Aslan arguing that its land grants would have been insufficient. Ionescu asked for a formal inquiry into the revolt—although he also supported the cabinet's focus on a balanced budget. By then, Ionescu's own son Eugen had joined Junimea's parliamentary group. Alecu Holban also took that road, reemerging as one of Carp's foremost "devotees" in Iași. He also joined the Conservative Party—which, after absorbing Vernescu's group, was styled "Liberal-Conservative Party". In this capacity, he spoke out against the Iași socialists, identifying them as proxies for the PNL. He also backed the Junimist approach to land redistribution. This policy was central to his platform for the April 1889 by-election for Roman's 3rd College, which he won by a large margin against the socialist Vasile Morțun.

During early 1889, Catargiu formed a new Conservative cabinet that excluded the Junimists. Holban was offered the Ministry of Public Works, but refused to accept it, specifically because he had remained loyal to Theodor Rosetti. In October 1889, Carol made another visit to Iași, finding himself reluctantly greeted by the same Holban—who was secretly still his "irreconcilable enemy". By then, the PNL was negotiating with the Opposition Committees and obtaining backing from their left-wing remnants—those groups respectively led by Ceaur-Aslan, C. Corjescu, Mârzescu, and Panu. In late 1889, Ionescu Sr was affiliated with the Liberal Democratic caucus, formed by Dumitru Brătianu against the PNL; his colleagues there included G. Sturdza and Nicolae Fleva. The old man was finally inducted by the PNL in 1890. Although he was awarded a seat on the PNL Central Committee, his political involvement was reduced to occasional speeches. Like Eugen, who also crossed the floor and joined the PNL, Ionescu remained essentially an outsider, "free and independent" within that party.

Also in 1890, Gheorghian stepped down as the PNL leader in Iași, leaving his seat open for competition between Ștefan Șendrea, Vizanti, and Colonel Petrovan. Ceaur-Aslan, Corjescu and Tzony joined Mârzescu and Constantin Langa in taking seats as Conservative allies during the May 1891 election, which also marked a temporary split between the Conservatives and Junimea. Their association, consolidated around 1889 as "a softened expression of the old separatist movements", was officially introduced as a "League for the Defense of Moldavia's Interests". The Junimist paper Era Nouă argued that this group, derisively designated as Liga-Langa (the "Langa League"), was a front for Mârzescu's political machine, disguised as serving regionalism and the "Moldavian interests". It participated in the subsequent county and communal elections, but was voluntarily dissolved (despite Corjescu's attempts to revive it) around October 1891. The crisis had been sparked by Ceaur-Aslan, who withdrew from the alliance, declaring it a "cohort of political charlatans". In that context, he extended an invitation to the "young native Jews", asking for their input in drafting a compromise law on naturalization. Langa's partisans maintained that the League had been brought down by "secretive intrigues" (uneltiri ascunse).

=== Later echoes ===
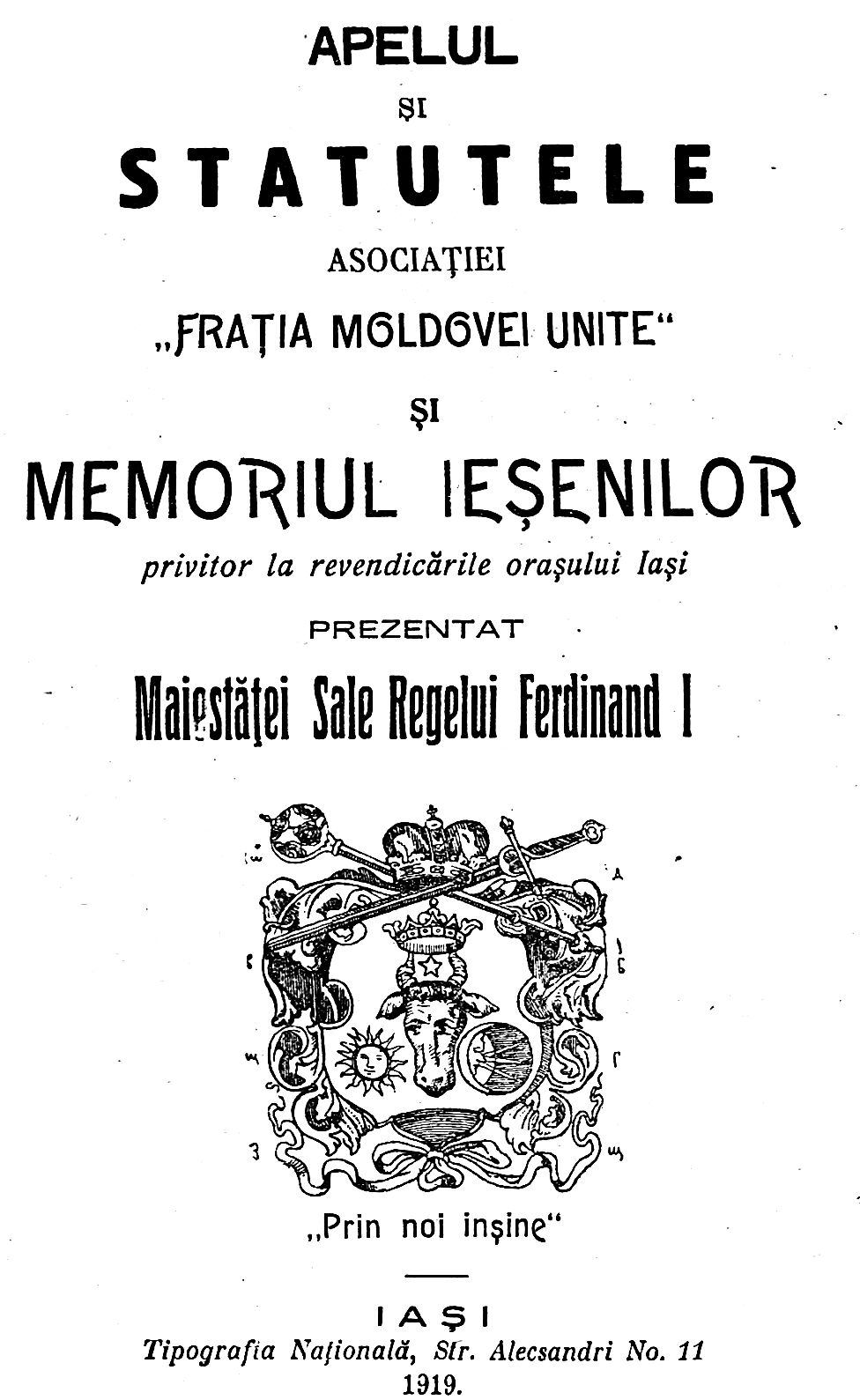
Founding charter of the Brotherhood of Unified Moldavia, published at Iași in 1919. Featuring a Moldavian coat of arms taken from the 1680 Psalter

Though Voinov had joined Junimea, he sided with N. Ionescu in defending Moldavian privileges. With their Assembly speeches in January 1891, they argued that Wallachia was treating Moldavia in a colonial manner, with non-natives appointed to most government offices. Nationalist-liberal discourse was still at the center of Ceaur-Aslan's politics. He focused on questioning the Conservative administration's policies on immigration, insisting that measures be taken "to defend the borders and keep out foreign Jews"; he also proposed defeating Jewish retailers with state-sponsored county fairs. He was reelected as a Conservative ally in the race of February 1892, but "unable to find a place in any of today's parties", stood as an independent antisemite. In that context, Ceaur-Aslan began circulating claims that Romanian Jews were a "political, economic, and commercial association"—and, according to the Jewish community weekly Egalitatea, never provided verifiable evidence to support these. During 1896, he proposed legislation that would have made one's house an inalienable piece of property. As argued at the time by Era Nouă, Ceaur-Aslan was courting the debt-stricken electorate ("What could be more popular in this country than helping the small owner with evading his debt payments?"), while also creating issues for the mainly Jewish creditors. That year, Ceaur-Aslan joined Fleva's parliamentary faction, which called for the enactment of "liberal reforms"; by 1897, he was a noted proponent of universal suffrage.

In contrast, Alecu Holban, who still regarded himself as the Factionalist leader, moved farther to the right and, by 1894, was one of the Conservative bosses in Iași—alongside Junimists such as Pogor and the Negruzzis. In the late 1890s, old Factionalists Mârzescu and Ștefan Șendrea also embraced a conservative and monarchist platform, joining Petre S. Aurelian's Drapelul group of PNL dissidents. Withdrawn from active politics to serve as a functionary for the Court of Cassation, Tacu died in October 1895. Tzony also died, vacating his senatorial seat, in March 1898. Soon after, Vizanti disappeared from public life: a habitual gambler, he had embezzled funds allocated for the Kogălniceanu Statue, and escaped prosecution by resettling in America. Reports from July 1899 suggest that he had eloped with a young woman from Reading, Pennsylvania, and had joined in the Klondike Gold Rush.

Voinov died in May 1899. Still putting out the weekly Prietenul Poporuluĭ in 1900, the aging Mârzescu had returned to "almost anti-dynastic" feelings and the "agitatorial, activist spirit of 1866". In 1902 (the year of Ceaur-Aslan's retirement and death), Hasdeu wrote the Faction's epitaph, noting that it had burned its "rather short fuse", whereas Junimea, being able to canvass outside Moldavia, "lasted longer." Ionescu Sr died in Bradu in January 1905, being commemorated as the "soul of the 'free and independent faction' group, and thereafter a steadfast national liberal". Some two years later, A. C. Cuza, leader of the antisemitic trend in Moldavia, revisited Ionescu and Holban's stances with an article called "Our Folks". In 1912, having established his own Democratic Nationalist Party (PND), Cuza openly deplored the Faction's demise—since, in the wake of Bărnuțianism, Iași's youth had come under the influence of "anarchic socialism". According to PNL monarchists, the aged Holban was allowed by the Conservatives to publish "the most egregious attacks on our Sovereign [Carol]", whenever these were politically suitable—but only until 1911, when he was left entirely isolated in that party. In 1913, he issued his old press contributions, including his 1864 antisemitic piece, as a brochure. It was seen by Opinia newspaper as an attempt to "reconnect with current affairs."

Holban survived the early stages of World War I and Romanian participation in it. He died in May 1917 at Iași, which was at the time the provisional capital—with all of southern Romania having been occupied by the Central Powers. From late 1918, a series of events which reversed the situation also led to the establishment of a Greater Romania. Some tenets of Factionalist politics were still being upheld by Cuza and the PND. During the 1919 elections, Cuza formed an alliance with the Brotherhood of Unified Moldavia (FMU), which raised awareness about the region's decline in the centralized state. The FMU, seen by the National Liberals as a "political platform" for the PND, included the old Factionalist Poni, who now called for a "moral decentralization" of Romania and a curb on French cultural imports. Reflecting on Cuza's other policies, Apostol Stan describes the PND as in effect the Faction's successor, similarly encouraged by a "continuously rising" Jewish presence and by a perceived need to contain socialist influence. Its activity helped rekindle antisemitism, leading up to the Iași pogrom of 1941. As argued in 1948 by Jewish researcher Matatias Carp, this drift into extreme violence was a direct result of a "poison [which] ate away soul and conscience for over three quarters of a century", leading back to Ionescu and Ceaur-Aslan.
