= Scarlat Vârnav =

Moldavian and Romanian political figure and Orthodox clergyman

Scarlat Vasile Vârnav (Sofronie Vârnav)
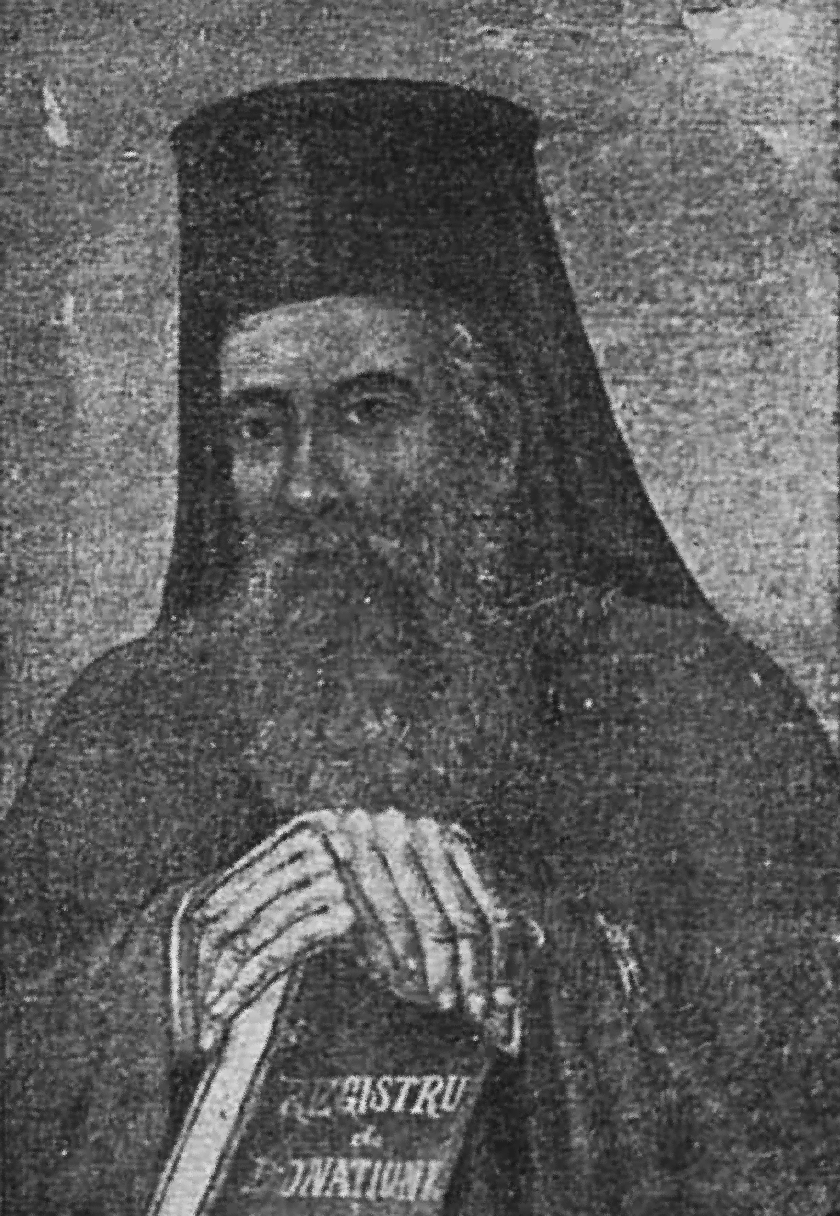
- Portrait of Vârnav in monastic clothes

Member of the Assembly of Deputies of Romania
- In office December 26, 1867 – January 6, 1868
- Constituency: Tutova County

Personal details
- Born: c. 1801–1813 Hilișeu, Dorohoi County, Moldavia
- Died: January 6, 1868 Bârlad, Principality of Romania
- Party: Free and Independent Faction (Tutova National Liberal Party)
- Other political affiliations: Frăția (1847–1848); National Party (ca. 1849–1859)
- Spouse: Eliza Jora
- Relations: Vasile Vârnav (father); Constantin Vârnav (brother); Gheorghe Bibescu (in-law); Mihail Kogălniceanu (in-law); Scarlat C. Vârnav (nephew)
- Profession: Landowner, librarian, philanthropist, revolutionary, monk, civil servant

Scarlat Vasile Vârnav, or Sofronie Vârnav (also known as Charles Basile Varnav, Charles de Wirnave, Varnavu or Vîrnav; died January 6, 1868 [O.S. December 25, 1867]), was a Moldavian and Romanian political figure, philanthropist, collector, and Orthodox clergyman. The scion of an aristocratic family, he was made to study for a career in the church, but fled Moldavia and studied abroad. Acquainted with the Romanian liberal movement and the Romanian nationalist movement, he helped establish bodies of intellectuals dedicated to cultural and political cooperation across the Danubian Principalities and beyond, including the 1846 Romanian library of Paris. His purchase of mainly Baroque paintings, donated by him to Academia Mihăileană, forms the core of the Iași Museum of Art.

With Nicolae Bălcescu and C. A. Rosetti, Vârnav also managed the Society of Romanian Students in Paris, whose revolutionary agenda brought him into conflict with European governments. He then played a small part in the French Revolution of 1848, before returning to take orders at Neamț Monastery, a Hieromonk and Starets. Throughout the 1850s, he and his brother Constantin, who was the son-in-law of Gheorghe Bibescu, took part in the nationalist movement that established the United Principalities, and was especially active as an electoral campaigner. However, his support of modernization in schools and the church was not welcomed by the religious establishment, and his stand-off with the conservative monks of Neamț resulted in the establishment of a dissident monastery. Subsequently, Vârnav lost the backing of Domnitor Alexandru Ioan Cuza, although he still approved of Cuza's authoritarian agenda.

After campaigning nationally in support of Carol I, Vârnav ended his career in Tutova County. Active in antisemitic circles, he was allied with the Free and Independent Faction. On this basis, he contested a seat in the Assembly of Deputies during December 1867, but died from a sudden illness just days after winning. Rumors that he was poisoned by Romanian Jews sparked a riot, which had to be quelled by armed intervention, and an official inquiry. He was survived by his brother Constantin and his nephew, engineer and politician Scarlat C. Vârnav.

== Biography ==
=== Early activities ===
It is known that Vârnav was a native of Hilișeu (or Silișeu), Dorohoi County, but other details remain sketchy, with his year of birth given as far back as 1801 or as recent as 1813. Historian Petronel Zahariuc notes that it may be impossible to pinpoint the exact date, though he believes that the most likely one was provided by Vârnav himself as being October 14, 1813. Zahariuc also points out that another record from Vârnav's day had 1810, and sees 1801 as unrealistic. A family manuscript, which has September 29, 1816, also notes that Vârnav was baptised by, and named after, the reigning Prince Scarlat Callimachi.

Vârnav belonged to a large family of the Moldavian boyar nobility, attested back to 1621; he was distantly related to Teodor Vârnav, the Bessarabian writer. His immediate ancestors had taken up liberal causes, inspired by the Carbonari. One relative, Petrachi, also led the Moldavian resistance to the "Sacred Band" during the civil war of 1821, alongside Gavril Istrati. Scarlat was generally believed to have been the son of Ban Vasile Vârnav (died 1824), noted as a book collector and translator to Romanian—in particular for his renditions of Dimitrie Cantemir's Descriptio Moldaviae, Condillac's Logique, Dionisie Fotino's Istoria tis palai Dakias, and Cesare Beccaria's On Crimes and Punishments. As argued by Zahariuc, this identification is partly misleading: Scarlat's father was indeed a Vasile Vârnav, but not the same as the translator; his wife, and Scarlat's mother, was Maria née Gheuca. The future monk's distant cousins included Sofronie Miclescu, who would later serve as Metropolitan Bishop of Moldavia.

Scarlat had a brother, Constantin (also known as Costandin or Costache), who trained himself as a surgeon. Together, the two inherited Hilișeu estate and part of Liveni. After an early education allegedly provided by his father, Scarlat began trying his hand at copying manuscripts. Zahariuc notes that both Scarlat and Constantin were sent to study abroad in Bukovina District "immediately after" the 1821 troubles, but that Scarlat had made it back to his home village in 1826. Following the death of his father, Maria remarried to another boyar, Costache Roset of Botoșani. One account is that Scarlat was selected by his mother to take orders in the Moldavian Church. According to this reading, he was tutored at home by his cousin Miclescu, but escaped to his relatives in Bukovina, and later made his way to Paris. His departure, whether or not prompted by the incident, is tentatively dated to between 1832 and 1836.

Vârnav lived in France until 1848. He attended Paris Law Faculty between 1837 and 1840, but he never took a diploma; he probably also heard literature courses at the College of Sorbonne. With his own private funds, he purchased the art collection of Aguado de las Marismas on the recommendation of Gheorghe Panaiteanu Bardasare. It included paintings by Caravaggio, Philippe de Champaigne, Egbert van Heemskerck, Eustache Le Sueur, Pietro Liberi, Bartolomé Esteban Murillo, and François Stella; Vârnav also owned a copy of Philippoteaux's La Retraite de Russie, which was probably done by the artist himself, and which he may have purchased at the Exposition nationale des beaux-arts of Brussels, in 1842. In 1847, he donated all artworks in his possession to the Moldavian state, which took little interest in the offer. The collection was left to deteriorate at a shipyard in Galați.

Taking up the cause of Romanian nationalism, Vârnav established in 1846 a Romanian library, which he dedicated to the "new era" of European liberalism, and also set the foundation for a Romanian Orthodox chapter in Paris. Regulars included Nicolae Bălcescu, who described the library as actually a salon and a "reunion center for us Romanians." According to the Moldavian liberal writer Gheorghe Sion, Vârnav was good friends with a Rom, Dincă, born into slavery at Pașcani. He tried to persuade Dincă not to return to his owners to Moldavia, offering to employ him as a secretary of the library. In the mid 1840s, Vârnav was also in contact with the agronomist and political thinker Ion Ionescu de la Brad, sponsoring his attempts to set up a model farm in southern Moldavia, and also offering to employ Ionescu as a trainer of peasants.

Vârnav family coat of arms

In his address to the library's patrons, which he printed in over 3,000 copies, Vârnav explained that he regarded the Romanian language and the church as the two "protective genii of our nationhood." Like Rosetti, he made reference to Romanians entering an "era of transition", explaining that "Phanariote" mores were "dead", but also that the "new ideas and new beliefs" had not yet settled. The prospects worried him: "we are at times troubled as to whether our so very backward nation might be allowed the time to enjoy those future joys". Vârnav's manifesto chided Westernized Romanians for forgetting their modernizing mission, and even their native language, suggesting that the two were inextricably linked. Overall, he proposed that the emerging Romanian literature needed to keep cosmopolitan tendencies in check: the predominant themes needed to display "originality and Romanianism" rather than the "illusions of the senses" and "chimeras of individual hurdles." His disregard for what he termed the "outer forms of civilization" was picked up by cultural historian Adrian Marino as prefiguring the conservative liberalism later embraced by Junimea society.

Vârnav's focus was on providing young intellectuals with a cultural training that was already in their vernacular language; this included efforts to discard the Cyrillic orthography as "foreign", and familiarize students with the various adaptations from Latin. He specifically asked book publishers to specify whether their books were in Latin or Cyrillic, intending to prioritize the former. His own experiments resulted in what historian Nicolae Iorga deems a "bizarre personal orthography". While the nationalist movement was struggling to popularize the name "Romanian" for the shared ethnicity and culture, and trying to settle on a spelling of that word, Vârnav suggested the variant Roumén(é), later replaced by român and română. He also proposed that linguists from the Danubian Principalities (Moldavia and Wallachia), as well as from other Romanian-speaking regions, meet up in congress "somewhere central to the Romanian lands".

=== Revolutionary ===
Vârnav argued that the political unification of Moldavia and Wallachia could originate from the cultural "fusion" that he was promoting in the Romanian student colony; his letters of the time opened with the slogan Vivat Unirea ("Long Live Union"). His campaigning led to the establishment of a Society of the Romanian Students in Paris on July 25, 1846, after preliminary networking by a Wallachian, C. A. Rosetti. In April, Vârnav had provided the enterprise with its first capital, by donating 400 Napoléons, and then emerged as the Society's administrator after earning Rosetti's full trust. The club held meetings at Vârnav's house in Quartier de la Sorbonne (Place de la Sorbonne, 3, where the library was also housed). Its triumvirate leadership comprised Rosetti and Ion Ghica of Wallachia, with the Moldavian Vârnav as cashier. However, Rosetti and Vârnav handled most of daily business, with Ghica effectively absent from Paris after August 1846; in later months, Rosetti also left, to be replaced by Bălcescu. This and other concerns prompted the Society to seek patronage from conservative figures in both Principalities such as Nicolae Ghica-Comănești, Roxanda Roznovanu, Alexandru Sturdza-Miclăușanu, and various others. Vârnav also offered honorary presidency to the French poet Alphonse de Lamartine who, as he recalled, accepted with "the greatest joy and affection".

Some records suggest that, from about 1845, Vârnav had been accepted into the Athénée des Etrangers, a Masonic lodge of the Grand Orient de France. According to genealogist Mihai D. Sturdza, Vârnav never joined the Freemasonry, though he was a member of Spiritist and esoteric lodges while in Paris. Despite his public overture to the conservative boyars, he had also joined the Wallachians' secret society, Frăția ("The Brotherhood"), which was repressed at home but maintained a presence in the diaspora; the Society itself may have been a front for Rosetti's revolutionary conspiracy. Privately, he expressed his dislike for the patronage, noting that Ghica-Comănești and the others had surrendered the Society to "backbiters". The Society was still highly popular, and, according to ledgers published by Vârnav, made a yearly profit of 21,200 francs in subscriptions and donations. He was able to sponsor scholarships for new recruits to the nationalist cause, including Nicolae Ionescu, N. Chinezu, and Ianache Lecca. Also as a result of new funding, he and Ghica were able to bail out the student Martino from debtors' prison.

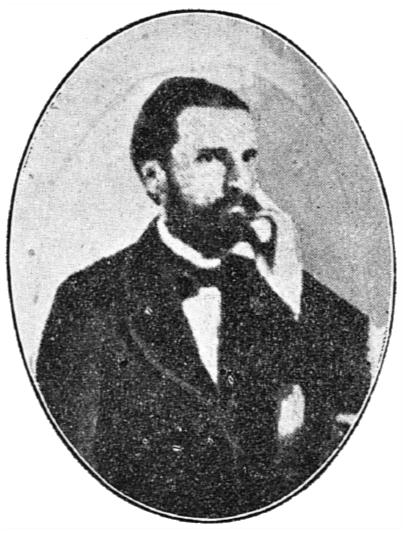
Vârnav's brother Constantin

In Moldavia, Constantin became famous for his advocacy of balneotherapy, and also for his work during the 1848 cholera epidemic: he was the only doctor of Iași to have survived the calamity. This was particularly unusual, as he did not believe that cholera was contagious, and relied on folk medicine in his attempts to cure it. He shared some of Scarlat's views about modernization, publishing his plans to set up a sanitary service and medical schools. From 1844, he was also son-in-law of the Wallachian Prince Gheorghe Bibescu, a conservative figure. Nonetheless, the Students' Society revolutionary connections irritated Bibescu, and also caused concern in Russia, which, at the time, shared custody of the Principalities. Despite Lamartine's support, these developments also worried the French monarchy, which was transitioning to conservatism. The Guizot government chose not to give any recognition to the Society, pushing it into the underground.

In early 1847, Vârnav's Library welcomed the French republican historian Edgar Quinet; after hearing Quinet speak, Vârnav reportedly stood up and obtained that all Romanians present swear an "oath that they would die for their motherland". By November of that year, Vârnav, Bălcescu, Lecca and Chinezu, alongside Grigore Arghiropol, Dimitrie Brătianu, Ion C. Brătianu and Mihail Kogălniceanu, had founded the semi-legal Însocierea Lazariană ("Lazarian Association"). Named in honor of Gheorghe Lazăr, it had a political project to unify and standardize education in both Principalities. This agenda was seen as untimely by other intellectuals, including Alexandru G. Golescu, who refused to participate. Now openly drawn to radical politics, Vârnav became an active participant in the February Revolution. He rallied with the majority of Romanian students who saluted the French Provisional Government, outvoting the more cautious young boyars, including Vasile Alecsandri and Costache Negri. According to a letter sent home by Mihail Kogălniceanu's brother Alecu, Vârnav was regarded as "insane" by the more conservative exiles, who feared that he had no grasp of the revolution's weakness. He went on to serve briefly in the National Guard and set up a first-aid station inside his library. As reported by N. Ionescu, the events also saw the creation of a single Romanian tricolor, combining the Wallachian blue-yellow and the Moldavian blue-red.

Constantin, meanwhile, played a part in the abortive Moldavian liberal revolution, helping to draft its only manifesto. Scarlat fed this effort by sending his friends at home issues of the French radical newspapers, especially La Démocratie Pacifique. This activity created the impression that Vârnav himself was editing the newspaper; as noted by Zahariuc, it remains plausible that Vârnav was in fact the author of Romanian-centered news in La Démocratie Pacifique, and, as such, that he was attracted by socialism in its Fourierist form. Vârnav reportedly tried to cross the border into Moldavia that March, just days before of the revolutionary attempt; the conservative Prince Mihail Sturdza ordered the border guards to prevent him from doing so. One of his companions, Toderiță Râșcanu, managed to pass through, but soon after had to flee for Wallachia. Vârnav made a return to Bukovina, where other Moldavian radicals had found temporary refuge. He proposed that the library funds be used to sponsor selective clandestine returns to the country; when other Society members argued against this initiative, he promised to pay back the money using his personal assets. Some reports suggest that Vârnav eventually returned to his native country alongside Claude Thions, Consul to Moldavia of the French Second Republic. Zahariuc dismisses these as rumors, proposing that they may refer to another Scarlat Vârnav. According to Ion Nistor, Vârnav received the title of Postelnic and was advanced to Sublieutenant in the Moldavian Militia; however, Iorga indicates, these were bestowed upon the other Vârnav, who had been allowed in Moldavia.

=== Unionist agent and legal troubles ===
As recounted by Zahariuc, Vârnav could only have been repatriated following the enthronement of Grigore Alexandru Ghica, a more liberal Prince, in late 1849. A passing note by an adversary suggests that in summer 1850 the Romanian Library had gone out of business, and that its Cashier "has returned to his family in Moldavia." Upon his eventual arrival, Moldavian officials asked him to pay storage fees for the Marismas collection, but he was also able to recover it from Galați. He ordered its restoration, and assigned it to Bardasare and Gheorghe Asachi at Academia Mihăileană. It was the basis of the Iași Museum of Art, which opened for the public in 1860. In 1850, after only a few months' novitiate, the former revolutionary was ordained a monk at Neamț Monastery, taking the name Sofronie Vârnav (transitional alphabet: Sofрonie Вaрnaвꙋ̆). Described by Iorga as intelligent, charitable and industrious, he was for a while the community's Starets, but apparently also returned to Hilișeu, where he enjoyed living among the peasants. He still maintained contacts with the Paris Orthodox circles, donating 5,000 ducats to the Romanian chapel, and, with Constantin, ceded a Czernowitz townhouse to the Romanian library of Bukovina Duchy, which opened in 1852. In 1851, both brothers also sponsored the establishment of a boys' school in Dorohoi.

As argued by Iorga, the monk was adamantly "democratic", and from the 1840s proudly listed himself a taxpayer (birnic); this was included as part of his signature on a letter he addressed to Prince Sturdza, causing the latter's annoyance and generating some interest from the French consul in Iași. Historian Nicolae Isar notes that, by using birnic as his title, Vârnav highlighted at once his ideas of self-sacrifice for the greater good and his critique of the boyar class as a drain on Moldavia's budget. Zahariuc however disagrees, suggesting that the name primarily invoked Vârnav's responsibilities at his Library and elsewhere. In a letter to George Bariț, Vârnav had also noted that birnic referred to his belief in "peaceful reform", the sort that required material investment rather than bloodshed. While maintaining a profile in philanthropy, Vârnav acquired a negative reputation, and, in March 1856, a formal investigation by the Ispravnic of Dorohoi, for his violent persecution of the peasants, his disregard for others' property, and his attempts to chase away police agents inspecting his lands. One allegation was that he had personally tortured a Moldavian Gendarme for three days on end. Vârnav, who had obtained French citizenship, could not be tried in a regular tribunal; the French consul heard and dismissed the charges against him in December 1857. The Vârnavs sold their Dorohoi estate over the late 1850s, with Scarlat liquidating all his assets there in December 1857. His land was sold to Eugeniu Alcaz.

From before 1850, Vârnav had been affiliated with the National Party, which supported the unification of Moldavia and Wallachia. This prompted speculation that his turn to religion, again publicized in 1858, was a ruse for nationalists to have an agent of influence in the clergy. A passing note by Bishop Iacov Antonovici contradicts this claim, suggesting that Vârnav, whom he knew and befriended, wanted to raise the intellectual level of the church by climbing through church ranks. A hostile account by Hieromonk Andronic Popovici contrarily suggests that Vârnav turned to monasticism as a result of scandals on his estate, during which "his woman ran away". As Andronic claims, Vârnav was faced with a choice between prison and monastery, and chose the latter. This account is doubtful, with some biographers doubting that Vârnav was ever married; according to Antonovici, he "slept in his clothes and would never allow any woman to visit him, under no pretext." M. D. Sturdza notes however that Vârnav had been the husband of Eliza Jora, making him brothers-in-law with Kogălniceanu.

Vârnav was again visible in political life shortly after the Crimean War, which inaugurated a series of major changes in Moldavian society. At the time, he openly celebrated Captain G. Filipescu for his defiance of the invading Russian Army, and later sent him a stallion. By June 1856, Vârnav was one of the Roman County clergymen who adhered to the National Party's Unionist Committee, which openly advocated the Principalities' merger, and later signed petitions for union's international recognition. Before the election of July 1857, he became the head organizer of the National Party in Bacău County, during which time he became highly aware of the censorship and intimidation tactics used against his colleagues. As "Hieromonk Varnav", Scarlat was a registered elector for the clergy estate in the Diocese of Huși, while Constantin was registered with the boyars' college at Dorohoi. Their campaigning failed to prevent an anti-unionist, Iorgu Mavrodin, from taking a seat in the ad-hoc Divan. Both Vârnavs signed a letter of protest condemning Moldavia's Education Minister, Alexandru Sturdza-Bârlădeanu, for using his position to canvass anti-unionist votes.

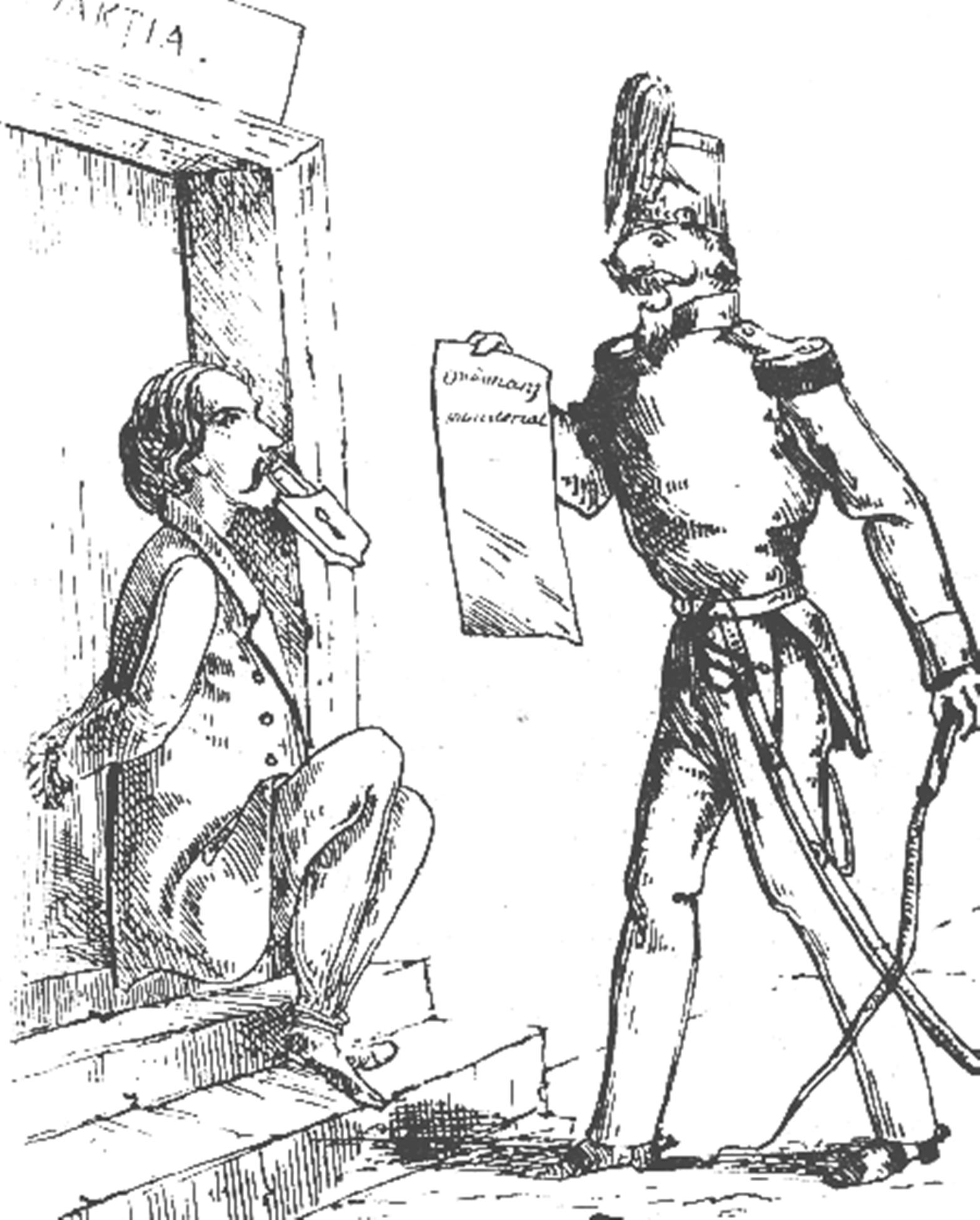
1859 cartoon mocking the censorship laws enforced under Alexandru Ioan Cuza

The results were cancelled due to widespread electoral fraud by the anti-unionists; during the repeat election of September, Scarlat himself was documenting instances of authoritarian abuse, describing how peasant voters in Broscăuți were being threatened with physical harm by a servant of the Mavrodin boyars. For these elections, Vârnav endorsed an old friend, Vasile Mălinescu, who became a county delegate to the Divan. The younger Vârnav brother remained active with the National Party; he published the short-lived gazette Timpul ("Times"), and eventually ran in the elections of 1858, representing Dorohoi in the Divan. His campaign was organized by Scarlat, who lectured the peasant voters of Hilișeu in church and re-baptized the village rallying point as "Union Square".

The Divan's subsequent election of Alexandru Ioan Cuza as Domnitor of the United Principalities was saluted as a major fulfillment in Scarlat's letters to Constantin Hurmuzachi. Described as an "independent unionist", he agitated in the streets, mocking his 1848 adversary Prince Sturdza, who had stood as a Moldavian-and-separatist candidate for the throne. As recounted by literary historian N. Petrașcu, it was who first Vârnav quipped that Strudza's royal cypher, M.S.V., stood for Mai Stăi Voinice ("Whoa There Fella")—and thus launched an urban legend. However, writer V. A. Urechia also claimed paternity of that particular joke. Vârnav is known to have introduced several slogans for the unionist cause, which appeared on painted banners; his favorite was: Viața, averea, onorul, / Patriei prosternă Românul! ("The Romanian to his Motherland / Pledges his life, his fortune, his honor!"). This was also featured on his 1859 testament, by which he donated all his belongings to the Paris library.

=== Church conflicts ===
Recorded as living among the monks of Neamț from December 31, 1857, Vârnav took orders at Secu Monastery a few months later. He subsequently became a proponent of innovation, creating controversy with his belief that monks should let their estate be curated by the state, his attempt at introducing polyphony, and his moves to do away with Slavonic services. As noted by Zahariuc, the conflict was exacerbated when Vârnav, backed in this by Miclescu, used church events to popularize the unionist cause, including among pilgrims arriving in from Russia's Bessarabia Governorate. These efforts created situations that appeared to other monks as irritatingly "playful and non-canonical". During the early part of his stay, Vârnav donated to the Secu patrimony items replicating the Romanian tricolor scheme, including tassels and a large ribbon.

Vârnav thereafter involved himself in the controversy over the full secularization of monastery estates, which also doubled as Cuza's attempt at curbing Russian influence within the national borders. Unlike a circle of conservative monks, led by Andronic Popovici, Vârnav and his followers were enthusiastic about the proposed secularization; Popovici called Vârnav the "new heretic of Moldavia". Moldavia's Education Minister, Alexandru Teriachiu, assigned Vârnav to a reform committee which uncovered great irregularities at Neamț, including a dysfunctional seminary and an inhumane ward for the insane. Vârnav refurbished the seminary, and then also organized the peasant schools of Neamț County, serving as inspector. Proposed innovations he "learned at Paris", now included the establishment of a printing press and the demolition of new additions to the historical site. However, he was also suspected of giving away boons, including the monastery's cloth factory and a large press, to his patron Mihail Kogălniceanu and to the government itself.

Such activism, and also his harsh temper, led to numerous complaints. The new minister, Dimitrie Rosăt, protected Vârnav. He scolded those monks who wanted him tried by church tribunal, calling them the "hirelings of Russia". Vârnav himself had a long-standing feud with Popovici, whom he accused of using sermons to promote anti-Cuza sentiments and Russophilia. Facing opposition from the mostly conservative monks, Sofronie failed in his bid to be elected as Archimandrite, having to share administrative power with a traditionalist, Timofei Ionescu. In September 1861, Vârnav finally obtained Popovici's demotion, prompting the latter to cross over into the Bessarabia Governorate and set up Noul Neamț Monastery outside Kitskany. Andronic claimed that this establishment was merely a lavra for the old one. Vârnav, who kept the monastery seal on him, did not validate this in writing, but his adversaries either forged or obtained permission from other administrators.

Eventually, by 1862, Alexandru A. Cantacuzino took over at the ministry and had Vârnav arrested. Vârnav pleaded for his case and petitioned the Divan with letters also taken up in Tribuna Română gazette. Archimandrite Timofei dismissed his defense as fantasy, depicting Vârnav as a persecutor of his monks, who had loosely interpreted Cuza's policies in order to suppress dissent at the monastery. He was allowed to return after a few weeks in jail, in time to witness the great fire which affected Neamț in December 1862; in their polemical writings, the renegades of Kitskany alleged that Vârnav himself was the arsonist. Finally forced out of the monastery in 1862, he drifted toward Wallachia and spent some time in Buzău. It was probably this more sympathetic community that bestowed upon him the titles of Hieromonk and Protosyncellus.

According to church historian Melchisedec Ștefănescu, Vârnav, being "detested by the public and disgraced by prince Cuza", settled in Bucharest, "providing his services to whoever would need them." He sees the former Starets as an extremist and a heretic, "formed in the school of Blanqui, Pyat [and] Rochefort". Vârnav found employment at Sfântul Dumitru–Poștă Church in Lipscani, which answered directly to the Archdiocese of Buzău. This position helped him to resume contacts with his old friend Rosetti, alongside whom Vârnav wished to reconfigure Romanian radicalism. The Hieromonk returned to favor in January 1864, when Dimitrie Bolintineanu, who chaired the unified ministry of education, appointed him to a commission that was tasked with assessing calendar reform. However, his name was immediately flagged and stricken out by the Romanian Metropolitan Bishop, Nifon Rusailă. Vârnav was instead auditor of the state charity funds, in which capacity he uncovered misuse and embezzlement by the political clientele. One such case referred to young girls collecting social welfare while serving as mistresses to some in the ministry staff.

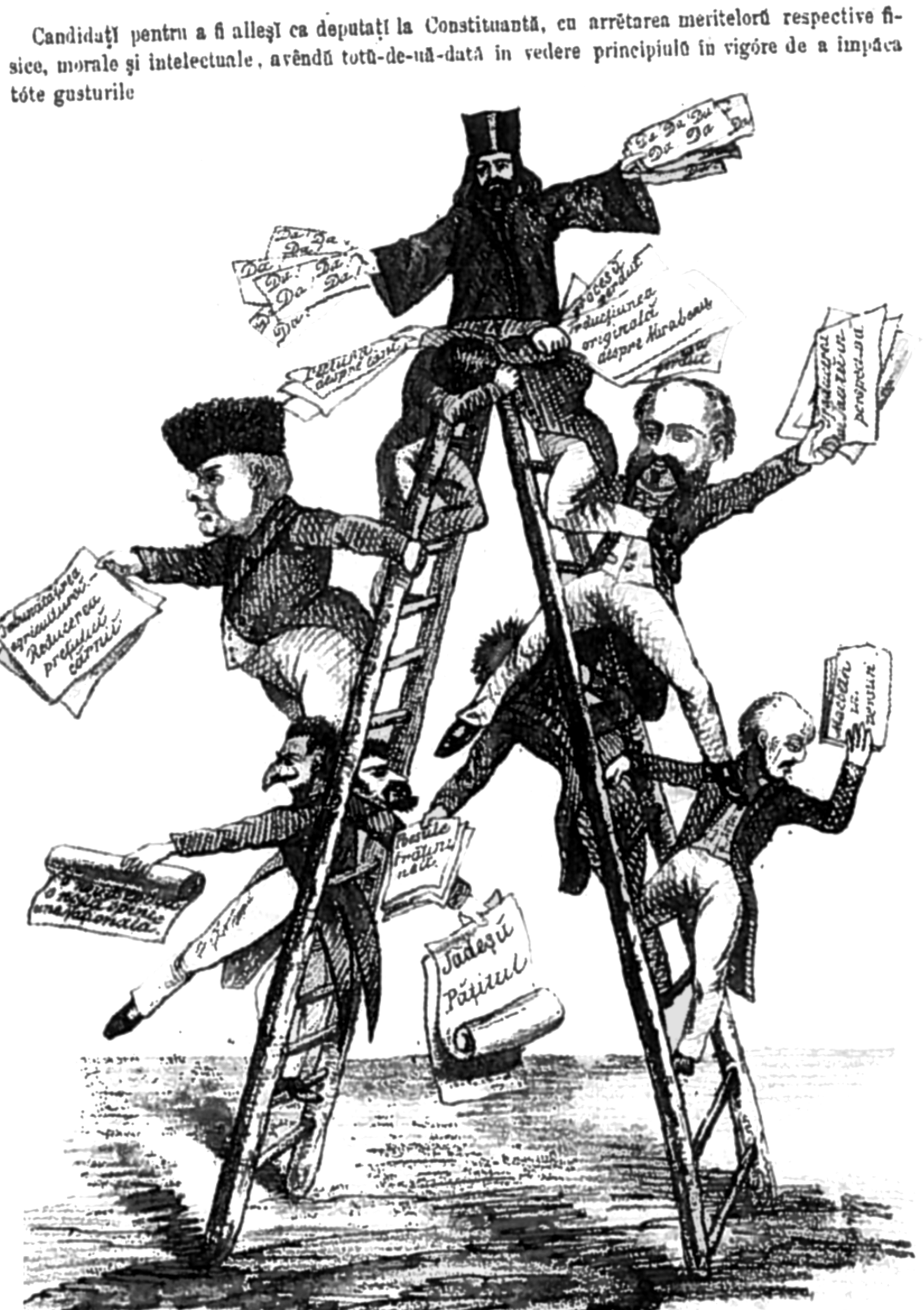
Satyrul cartoon for the elections of April 1866, showing Vârnav, with papers marked Da! ("Yes!"), at the top of the electoral ladder. Other figures pictured include Ion Ionescu de la Brad, Petre P. Carp, and Pantazi Ghica

Vârnav, who was reportedly a delegate to the Elective Assembly in 1864, supported Cuza's anti-parliamentary coup. Also a Cuza loyalist, Constantin Vârnav continued to serve on the Princely Court of Justice, where he notably enforced censorship laws against Ionescu de la Brad. During the coup events, Sofronie lived in a rented townhouse at Sfântul Dumitru, shared with Cuza's uncle Grigore. During the plebiscite of June 1864, organized by the Domnitor in order to increase his executive power and impose a land reform, he put up a "lit sign" reading: Popa Vârnav zice da or Părintele S. Varnav d̦ice Da (both meaning "Father [S.] Vârnav Says Yes"). As noted at the time by polemicist Bogdan Petriceicu Hasdeu, the sign was both of questionable taste and unintentionally humorous, since it did not clarify what was yes was being said to, concluding: "that great Vărnavŭ, being as zealous as ever, fell from the sublime into the ridiculous!"

=== 1867 campaign and death ===
On the morning of February 11, 1866, Cuza and his authoritarian regime were deposed by a "monstrous coalition" of liberals and conservatives. Just hours after, supporters of the coup ambushed Vârnav in his house. He was picked up, covered in tricolor cockades, and paraded into the Princely Palace on Mogoșoaiei Bridge; he was however welcomed and protected there by the regency council. Vârnav was out of the country, on a mission to Mount Athos—Rosetti, who took over as Education Minister, sent him over to consecrate the Romanian Monastery there. He returned with two Aromanian youths for training at the Bucharest Seminary. During the same interval, Carol of Hohenzollern, a foreign prince, was selected as the new Domnitor. Vârnav was again active in politics by April, which saw a plebiscite on Carol's acceptance, during which he traveled as far south as Ploiești and as far north as Bacău, persuading Wallachians and Moldavians alike to vote for Carol (and thus, for a cemented union). As Bishop Calinic Miclescu and others put up separatist resistance in Iași, he also took an emergency trip there, effectively acting as a negotiator between the two camps. Declaring himself against any attempt at separation, he hoped to ingratiate himself with the authorities and be assigned curator of Trei Ierarhi Monastery. He was still in the city in September, representing government at the funeral of his friend Anastasie Panu. Switching back to his civilian commitments, he angered Miclescu by announcing his bid for an Assembly of Deputies seat in the November 1866 election. This initiative resulted in another investigation by church authorities.

Vârnav ultimately settled in Bârlad in 1867, and his last months were spent in Tutova County politics, but also in efforts to furnish the local hospital. According to Melchisedec Ștefănescu, he also continued to "propagate his political and religious heresies". With Ion and Constantin Codrescu, P. Chenciu, A. V. Ionescu, and Ioan Popescu, he established a "National Liberal Party", which functioned as the provincial affiliate of the Moldavian-wide Free and Independent Faction. Like other Factionalists, Vârnav also involved himself in the debates over the issue of Jewish emancipation, and is described by biographer Dimitrie R. Rosetti as a "firebrand antisemite". According to a Jewish man's letter, published in L'Echo Danubien, his "preaching against the Israelites [was] of the most barbaric kind", disturbing the otherwise tolerant mood of Tutova. In the election of December 1867, Vârnav put himself up as a Tutova candidate for both the Senate and the Assembly. He was soundly defeated in the former race by Manolache Costache Epureanu (who took 163 out of 233 total votes), but was able to win a deputy's mandate at Tutova's Fourth College. Without ever taking his seat, he died at Bârlad, on January 6, 1868 [O.S. December 25, 1867], after illness that lasted "just one day".

The mysterious circumstances led to an autopsy, which found nothing of relevance. His stomach and intestines were dispatched to Bucharest, for a more in-depth toxicological inquest. Already before his death, rumor spread that his Jewish enemies had poisoned the Starets, who, despite his antisemitic campaign, had taken residence at a Jewish-owned hotel; a riot (or attempted pogrom) erupted in the city. As noted by D. R. Rosetti, "the excitement of the population required intervention of troops sent in from bordering counties, as a safeguard for the Jews, whose lives were being threatened." The same is noted by Iorga: "His death was found suspicious, and military measures were taken to curb the anti-Jewish movements." The conspiracy theory was shunned as "infamy" by C. A. Rosetti's daily Românul, which noted that "ignorance was exploited" by "the enemies of the country"—both in Tutova and Ialomița County (the scene of a scandal over allegations of blood libel). However, the paper also played down the riot, reporting that only the city synagogue and a few Jewish houses had been damaged.

== Legacy ==
An early report by Gazet'a Transilvaniei claimed that Bârlad's intelligentsia was directly involved in calming the populace, before "rebels" could succeed in destroying the synagogue. A detailed note of protest, signed by 200 notables of Bârlad, claimed that the riot had been started by mourners gathering in front of Vârnav's lodging, located opposite a Jewish establishment; altercations, they argued, had been provoked by the Jews, who "insulted [...] the agonizing patient" and attempted to injure peaceful mourners by hurling boiling water in their direction; the petitioners asked the Interior Minister Ion Brătianu not to punish the populace for what it viewed as "calumnies by the adversaries of the national cause". Alliance Israélite Universelle (AIU) sources tell that Vârnav himself had incensed the Romanian crowds earlier in the campaign, with endorsement from the Ștefan Golescu government. The pogrom, they argue, was attempted by some of the petitioners themselves, and higher authorities, who "arrested all the Jews, supposedly to protect them", actually "facilitated things for the rioters"; the investigation of the riot "was opened, but carried no effect." On February 25, Brătianu spoke in the Assembly to announce that "solely Jews" had participated in the riot.

As noted by the AIU, Vârnav's death was likely caused by "some rather particular disease." The Starets was buried at Bârlad's Sfinții Voievozi Cemetery later that month, but his belongings, including itemized lists of donations for the Transilvania Cultural Society, were still in police custody by February. Constantin, who served several terms in the Assembly and Senate, survived his brother by nine years, dying shortly after Romanian independence was achieved. His own son, Scarlat C. Vârnav, was by then becoming distinguished as a civil and military engineer. After managing the School of Bridges, Roads and Mines, he also pursued a career in politics with the Junimea constitutionalists in the 1890s. The Hieromonk's painting collection was only gradually restored by Gheorghe Șiller, who worked under Bardasare's supervision.

In the interwar period, Iorga took over and revived Vârnav's student library, which became the nucleus of a Romanian School in Fontenay-aux-Roses. The Vârnav line had been extinguished shortly after Romania entered World War I: in September 1916, Constantin's grandson Petre S. Vârnav was decapitated by shrapnel during the bombing of Zimnicea. By then, Iorga claims, both Scarlats had been unduly forgotten. Interest in Scarlat Sr and his work was revived in 1981 by the Orthodox scholar Antonie Plămădeală, who dedicated him a micro-monograph, part of a series on Romanian monks who were culturally prolific.
