= Hilișeu-Horia =

- Commune
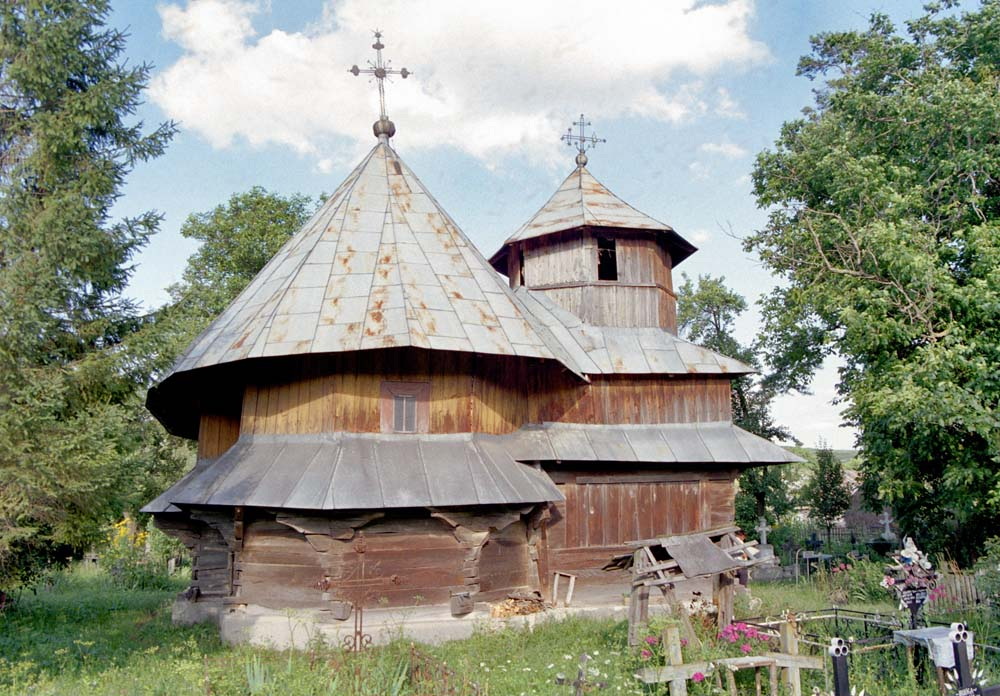

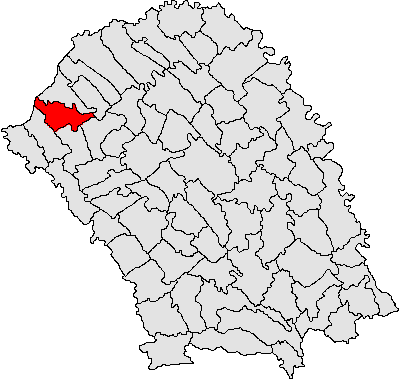
- Location in Botoșani County

- Location in Romania
- Coordinates: 48°02′N 26°15′E
- Country: Romania
- County: Botoșani
- Subdivisions: Hilișeu-Horia, Corjăuți, Hilișeu-Cloșca, Hilișeu-Crișan, Iezer

Government
  - Mayor (2024–2028): Ioan Poponaru (PSD)
- Area: 59.69 km^{2} (23.05 sq mi)
- Population (2021-12-01): 3,312
  - Density: 55.49/km^{2} (143.7/sq mi)
- Time zone: UTC+02:00 (EET)
  - Summer (DST): UTC+03:00 (EEST)
- Postal code: 717200
- Area code: +40 x31
- Vehicle reg.: BT
- Website: hiliseu-horia.ro

Hilișeu-Horia is a commune in Botoșani County, Western Moldavia, Romania. It is composed of five villages: Corjăuți, Hilișeu-Cloșca, Hilișeu-Crișan, Hilișeu-Horia and Iezer.

== Natives ==
- Scarlat Vârnav
