= Cloșca, Satu Mare =

Residential district of Satu Mare, Romania

Cloşca (also known as Micro 14) is a residential district of Satu Mare in Romania. It is named after the Romanian revolutionary Cloşca also known as Ion Oargă.
