= Stroe Belloescu =

Romanian teacher, politician and philanthropist

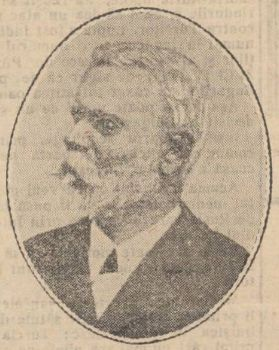
Stroe Belloescu

Stroe S. Belloescu (March 20, 1838 – October 20, 1912) was a Romanian teacher, politician, and philanthropist.

== Biography ==
Born in Câmpina to the well-to-do shepherds Stroe and Stana Beloiu of the Brașov area, he graduated from Ghent University in 1863 with a degree in Engineering. He taught Mathematics for two years at what is now the Nicolae Bălcescu National College in Brăila, rising to director in that time. He moved on to Bârlad's Gheorghe Roșca Codreanu National College in 1868, remaining there until his retirement in 1898.

Belloescu was elected to the Chamber of Deputies for Tutova County four times and to the Senate twice. An issue of interest to him was that of school textbooks, and in 1872, he authored the first Romanian-language high school arithmetic textbook, which went through four printings. He commanded a battalion during the Romanian War of Independence, becoming an officer of the Order of the Crown in 1882 for his deeds. In 1909, he was raised to grand cross of that order for his educational activities.

He established a private fund for the direct aid of the most promising pupils at his Bârlad school; this operated from 1906 to 1916; among the beneficiaries was Ștefan Procopiu. He donated the building for what is now Bârlad's Stroe Belloescu Library, as well as schools for the peasant children of Trestiana and Grivița, and a church for the latter village. Also there, in the schoolyard, in 1912, he financed the first bust of Alexandru Ioan Cuza in Romania. The school in Pleșa was donated by him as well, and named after him.

Together with his coachman, he was suffocated to death during a robbery in his home. He left a widow, Raluca.

== Death ==
Having the utmost respect for him, the citizens honored him with the confidence to represent them within the committees and societies and even in the Parliament of the Country as a senator. For the citizen services, he received the "Crown of Romania" in the degree of "Great Cross", one of the greatest distinctions of the time.

On October 20, 1912, Stroe S. Belloescu was assassinated by a group of nine robbers from Berești who believed they would find money in his house, not knowing what his great wealth consisted of.

His lifeless body was placed at the National House. There the whole of Bârlad, from old people to children and peasants from the surrounding areas, with teachers and all his former students have visited him. All the authorities of the Prefecture, the City Hall, the High Court, the Bar, as well as the magistrates, doctors, engineers, the intelligentsia of the city have lamented him that was a last tribute to the great citizen.

The Ministry of Cults and Public Instruction representatives brought the funeral wreath on whose white silk ribbon was written: "To Stroe Belloescu - The Spreader of Light and Gentile Love, the Supporter of Poor School children and the School Builder." The local and central media have written a lot about the death of this great Romanian intellectual, founder of settlements for the enlightenment of his brothers.

== In memoriam ==
The Inter-County Mathematical Competition "Stroe S. Belloescu" is organized annually in Bârlad for students of grades IV-VIII from Galați, Iași, Vrancea, and Vaslui counties. A street in Bârlad is named after him.
