= 1866 Romanian prince referendum =

A referendum on Prince Karl Ludwig of Hohenzollern-Sigmaringen becoming ruling prince was held in Romania on 20 April 1866. The proposal was approved by 99.97% of the votes cast, and Prince Karl Ludwig was subsequently enthroned as Domnitor with the regnal name Carol I on 23 October. His title was later raised to King of Romania in 1881.

== Results ==
| Choice | Votes | % |
|---|---|---|
| For | 685,969 | 99.97 |
| Against | 224 | 0.03 |
| Invalid/blank votes | | – |
| Total | 686,193 | 100 |
| Registered voters/turnout | 811,030 | 84.60 |
Source: Direct Democracy

↓
| 99.97% |
Yes
