= Tinosu (archaeological site) =

Archeological site in Romania

- Pisculești
- Location within Romania
- 44.8252°N 26.0122°E
- Location: Pisculeşti, Romania

History
- Abandoned: 1st century CE

Site notes
- Archaeologists: Cezar Bolliac
- Condition: Ruined

Tinosu or Pisculeşti was a Dacian fortified town, occupied sometime between the 2nd century BCE to 1st century CE. On the eastern bank of the Prahova River, it was fortified with a fosse and palisade-topped wall. The site was excavated by Cezar Bolliac in the 1860s. Discoveries of Getic and Roman coins from the reign of Claudius allowed archaeologists to date its occupation.
