= Tinosu =

- Commune
- Coat of arms

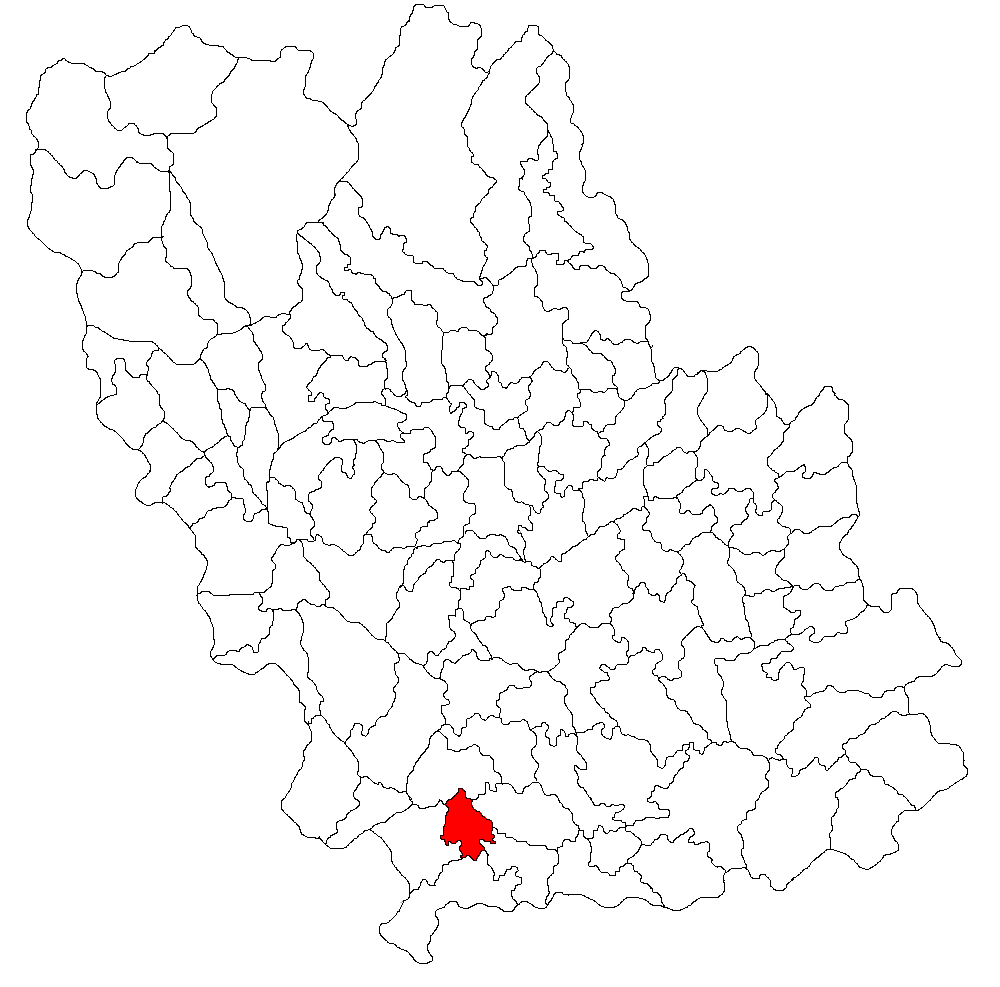
- Location in Prahova County

- Location in Romania
- Coordinates: 44°49′N 26°1′E
- Country: Romania
- County: Prahova

Government
  - Mayor (2024–2028): Iulian-Gabriel Andrei (PNL)
- Area: 18.1 km^{2} (7.0 sq mi)
- Elevation: 113 m (371 ft)
- Population (2021-12-01): 2,138
  - Density: 120/km^{2} (310/sq mi)
- Time zone: EET/EEST (UTC+2/+3)
- Postal code: 107610
- Area code: +(40) 244
- Vehicle reg.: PH
- Website: comunatinosu.ro

Tinosu is a commune in Prahova County, Muntenia, Romania. It is composed of three villages: Predești, Pisculești, and Tinosu.

The ruins of a Dacian fortified town is located near the villages of Tinosu and Pisculești.

Historical population
Year	Pop.	±%
1992	2,674	—
2002	2,598	−2.8%
2011	2,443	−6.0%
2021	2,138	−12.5%
Source: Census data
