= Monstrous coalition =

Name given to a Romanian political coalition in the 1860s

Leaders of the "monstrous coalition"

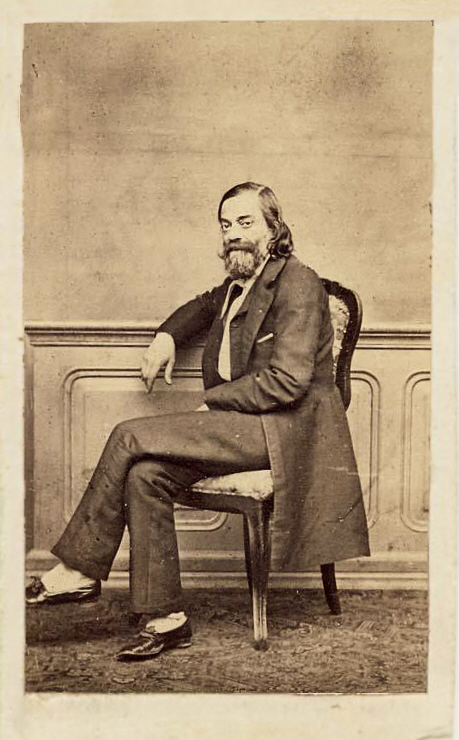
C. A. Rosetti (1816–1885)

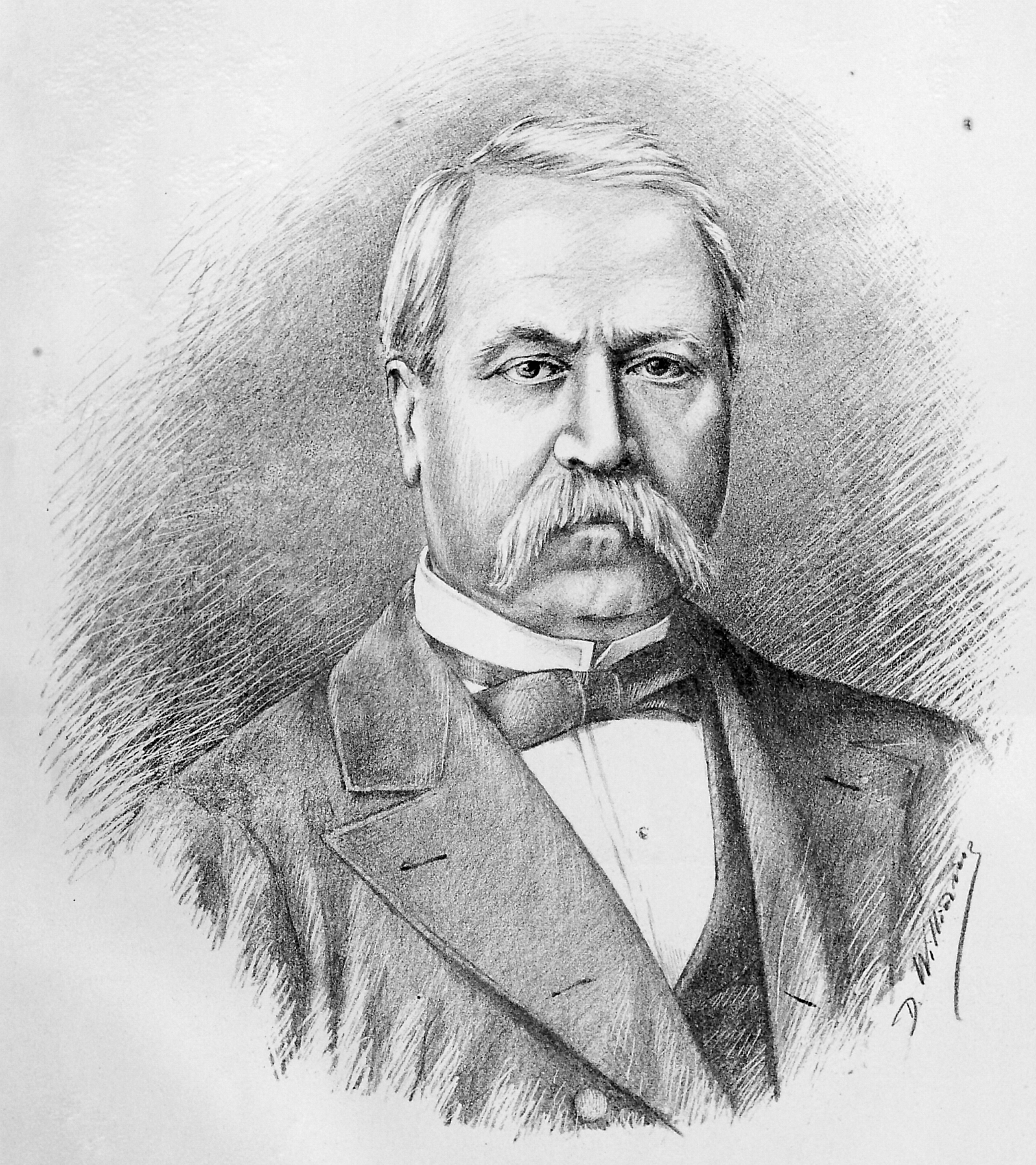
Lascăr Catargiu (1823–1899)

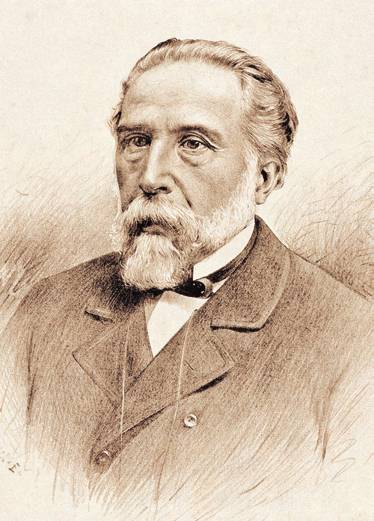
Ion Ghica (1816–1897)

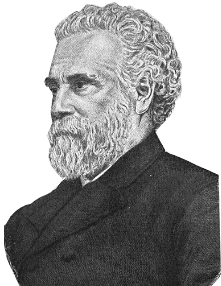
Ion C. Brătianu (1821–1891)

"Monstrous coalition" (Romanian: Monstruoasa coaliție) was the name given by pro-Alexandru Ioan Cuza journalists to the alliance between conservatives and radical liberals which forced Cuza from power in 1866.

== Background ==
Although at the first analysis a coalition between the political centrists (radicals) and the political right (conservatives) would seem unnatural in 19th century Romania, it was logical within the political context of the time: the personal authoritarian regime introduced by Cuza.

Authoritarian tendencies began to be manifested by the ruler early in 1863, and the personal regime was installed after the coup d'état of 2 May 1864. He increased his own power at the expense of other institutions. On 10 May, Cuza amended, through plebiscite, the Paris Convention, which had hitherto functioned as a constitution for the United Principalities, transforming it into Developing Statutes of the Paris Convention. The most important change was the redistribution of state organization so that the ruler should have more powers. From this point, the political scene was divided into two camps: Cuzists and opposition. Moreover, the ruler govern through trustworthy moderates, such as Mihail Kogălniceanu and Nicolae Kretzulescu.

The leaders of this coalition were the radical C. A. Rosetti, the conservative Lascăr Catargiu and the moderate Ion Ghica.

== Consequences ==
The "monstrous coalition" was supported by large landowners and businessmen who were not satisfied with the policy of the ruler. A coalition emerged in 1864, after the National Assembly elections in Romania, second convocation, and was chaired by Ion C. Brătianu. Mihail Kogălniceanu remained loyal to Alexandru Ioan Cuza. In 1866, the coalition performed a coup d'état. On the morning of 11 February, at five o'clock, a group of soldiers entered the Royal Palace and forced the ruler to accept the abdication. Cuza was forced to swear that he would abdicate, after seven years of rule, and leave the throne to a foreign prince, as required in one of the provisions of the ad-hoc divans of 1857. The unionist press related that the argument of this heinous act was the charge that the elected ruler would have betrayed the interests of the country to a foreign power.

Two days later, on 13 February, Cuza left Bucharest, taking the road to Vienna, and, after him, on 10 May 1866, Prince Karl of Hohenzollern-Sigmaringen was proclaimed ruler of Romania, under the name of Carol I. Subsequently, Carol was asked to allow Cuza to return home. The monarch sent the request to the Council of Ministers, which rejected it.
