= Dacian fortress of Crăsanii de Jos =

Dacian fortified town

- Location within Romania
- 44.6007°N 26.8867°E
- Location: Piscul Crăsani, Crăsanii de Jos, Ialomița, Romania

History
- Built: 4th century BC

Site notes
- Excavation dates: 1870; 1923; 1969
- Archaeologists: Dimitrie Butculescu; Ioan Andrieșescu
- Condition: Ruined

Monument istoric
- Reference no.: IL-I-m-A-14039.01

The Dacian fortress of Crăsanii de Jos was a fortified town in the land of Dacia.
