= István Hajnal =

Hungarian historian and palaeographer

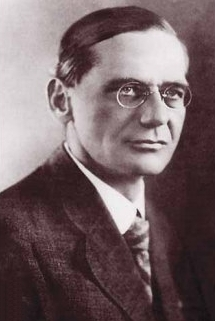
István Hajnal

István Hajnal (3 July 1892 – 16 June 1956) was a Hungarian social historian and palaeographer. Hajnal has been characterised as "perhaps the most prominent Hungarian palaeographer of [the twentieth] century." He had wide-ranging interests in medieval and modern history, including the history of technology, the history of communication, and the relation of history to sociology.

== Life ==
Hajnal was born in Nagykikinda, in the Kingdom of Hungary. In 1921 he gained his Privatdocent, and started teaching at the University of Budapest, where he was Professor of Modern History from 1930 to 1949. He became a corresponding member of the Hungarian Academy of Sciences in 1928, and was an Academician from 1939 to 1949. He was also an official at the Hungarian National Museum.

== Reputation ==
In the 1980s Hajnal's work, promoted by László Lakatos, "suddenly burst into public consciousness as an oeuvre comparable with and compatible with the Annales. The István Hajnal Circle [Hajnal István Kör], named after him, sponsors research into East Central European social history.

== Works ==
- L'enseignement de l'écriture aux universités médiévales, 1954.
- Az újkor története [History of the Modern Age], Budapest: Akadémiai Kiadó, 1988.
