= 1864 Romanian general election =

General elections were held in the United Principalities on 24 and 25 November 1864.
