= Anastasie Fătu =

Romanian physician, naturalist, philanthropist (1816–1886)

Aga Anastasie Fătu
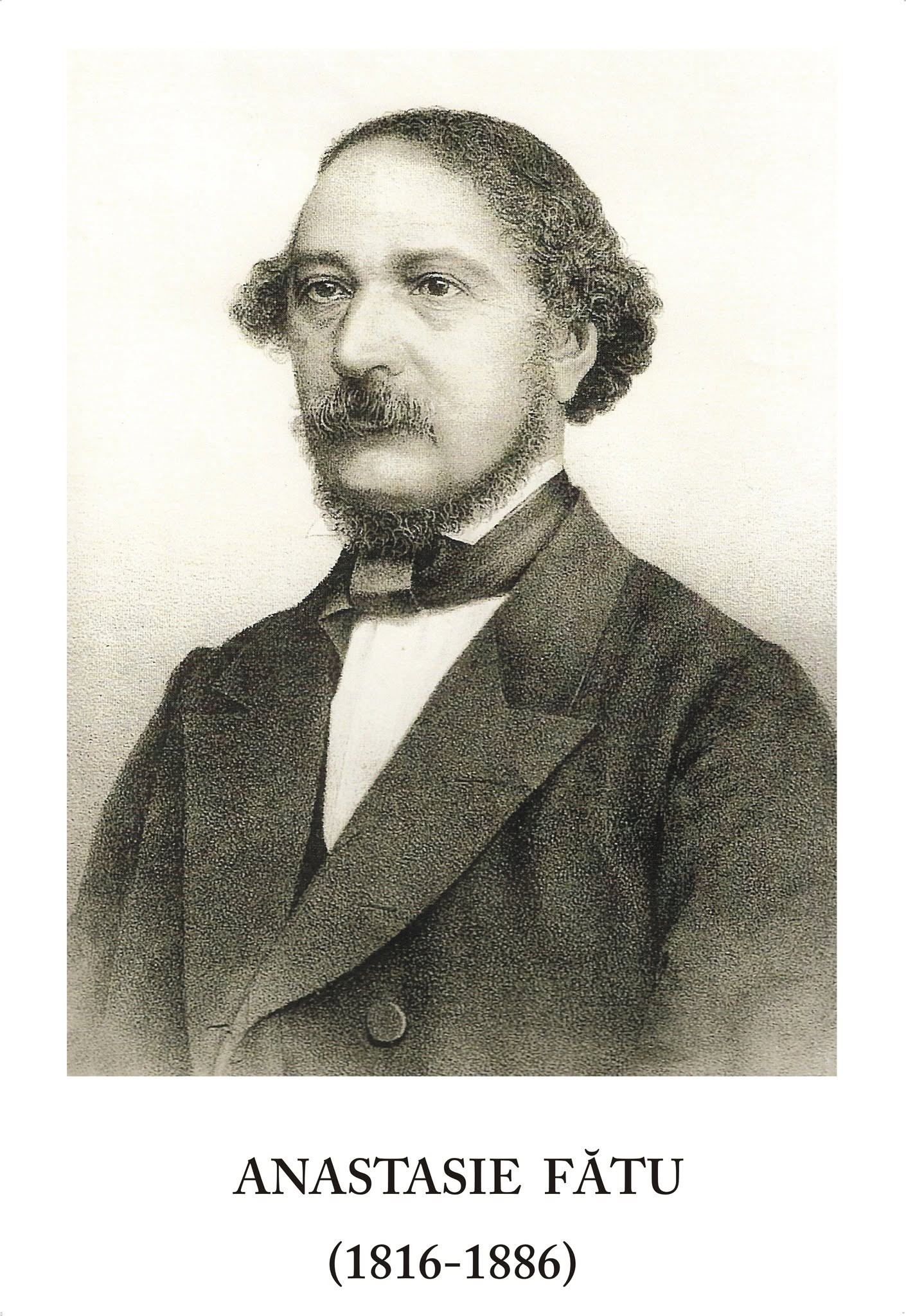
- Photograph of Fătu, ca. 1850
- Born: January 2, 1816; Mușata, Fălciu County, Moldavia
- Died: March 15, 1886 (aged 70); Iași, Kingdom of Romania
- Other names: Năstase Fêtu, Năstase Fĕtu, Anastasius Fétul, Anastasie Fĕtul, Anastase Fătul
- Scientific career
- Fields: Physiology; Cardiology; Pediatrics; Obstretics; Balneotherapy; Dietetics; Social medicine; Medical jurisprudence; Botany; Zoology
- Workplaces: Gregorian Institute; Iași Botanical Garden; Socola Monastery; Iași University; Romanian Academy; Iași Medical and Naturalist Society

Anastasie Fătu (originally Năstase Fêtu or Fĕtu, also known as Anastasius Fétul, Anastasie Fĕtul or Anastase Fătul; January 2, 1816 – March 15, 1886) was a Moldavian and Romanian medical doctor, naturalist, philanthropist and political figure, a titular member of the Romanian Academy and founder of Iași's Botanical Garden. Of lowly origins, he benefited from the meritocratic program instituted by Moldavia's government in the 1830s, and went on to study law at the University of Vienna, with hopes of becoming a political economist. After graduating, he changed his professional path, and trained in medicine at the University of Paris. Recognized for pioneering contributions in cardiology, pediatrics, obstetrics and balneotherapy, he was also an early speaker for public health and social medicine, as well as an educational theorist and textbook author. Fătu's career as a professor of natural sciences took him to the Gregorian Institute, the Socola Monastery school, and ultimately Iași University, where he took steps to create a regional medical school.

In parallel to his career in science, Fătu served one term in the ad hoc Divan (1857–1858), then several in the Parliament of Romania, initially its Assembly of Deputies; he was Assembly Chairman in 1868, and an associate of the Free and Independent Faction during the late 1860s and 1870s, espousing a platform of radical economic antisemitism. By 1878, he was part of the Factionalist chapter which caucused with the National Liberal Party.

Inducted into the Academy in 1871, he became one of its main sponsors, and thus a patron of hard science in Romania. While there, he helped standardize scientific references, and, siding with the partisans of phonemic orthography, participated in the creation of a specialized Romanian vocabulary. Criticized by his adversaries at Junimea society for his accumulation of offices, and for collecting a large salary as curator of Sfântul Spiridon Hospital, Fătu nevertheless donated most of his money to the Academy. The rest of his estate was at the center of legal disputes which lasted into the 1890s. Though largely forgotten within two generations, Fătu survived in cultural memory as a partial inspiration for Zaharia Trahanache, a ridiculous but ultimately likeable figure in Ion Luca Caragiale's political comedy, O scrisoare pierdută.

== Biography ==
=== Early life and studies abroad ===
While he remains fundamentally associated with the city of Iași, Fătu was actually born just to the south of it, at Mușata, Fălciu County—presently Vaslui County—on January 2, 1816 (Old Style: December 21, 1815). He had a younger brother, Iacob, who worked alongside Costache Conachi as a translator of literature. Their father, born into a peasant family, was a parson of the Moldavian Orthodox Metropolis. After finishing primary school in Huși, at the school maintained by the Orthodox bishopric, Anastasie passed an examination and received a scholarship for Iași's Vasilian Gymnasium, thus profiting from a meritocratic shift in Moldavian society. As noted by historian A. D. Xenopol, Moldavian Prince Mihail Sturdza and his adviser Gheorghe Asachi were tacitly encouraging "people from the lower strata of society" to acquire and education, and then to take up employment in the state apparatus, at the expense of boyardom. Scholar V. A. Urechia also records the "great diversity of origin" at the Vasilian boarding school, arguing that it was a positive contribution to Romania's culture.

From 1834, one of six Moldavians to have qualified for a scholarship from the banker-philanthropist Hagi Constantin Popp, Fătu was sent abroad, on condition that, upon graduating, he would return the favor by teaching a public "course in philosophy, law and political economy". He went on to study in the Austrian Empire at the University of Vienna. Another scholarship recipient was Anton Velini, who remained his friend in later years, and with whom he studied law, physics and mathematics as an undergraduate. It was also here that Fătu met ethnic Romanians from Austria's Bukovina District—Constantin Wassilko and the Hurmuzachi brothers, and, to some degree, also associated with students from Transylvania; together, they established a pan-Romanian club. After taking his Doctorate of Law, and also auditing courses at Vienna Medical Faculty (1839–1841), Fătu received permission from the Moldavian government to continue his studies in France; he enlisted at the University of Paris medical school, but remained in contact with the Vienna expatriates. By August 1846, he was friends with two other Moldavian youths in Paris, all three active politically: Alexandru Ioan Cuza, Scarlat Vârnav, and Nicolae Ionescu. His friends at home included fellow naturalist Ion Ionescu de la Brad, who noted admiringly that Fătu was "enamored with his studies", and an inspiration to the other Moldavians.

Fătu became a Doctor of Medicine in 1847, with a thesis on cardiac examination (including the study of menstruation flow), published under the name Anastasius Fétul (Des signes des maladies du coeur en général). He was invited to remain in Paris and practice there, but, after a series of European travels, he returned to Moldavia. He was appointed by Prince Grigore Alexandru Ghica to serve as head physician of Iași, and also as surgeon-general of the Moldavian Militia. His services were rewarded with a succession of boyar titles. He became a Ban in December 1851 (at roughly the same time, Iacob Fătu was Serdar); in April 1853, he became a Spatharios, and in October 1855 an Aga.

=== Rise to prominence ===
In 1850, Fătu contributed a monograph on the prevention of malaria; he also focused his activity on obstretics, balneotherapy and dietetics, with Învățătură dietetică relativă la scrofule ("A Dietary Instruction against Scrofulae"), followed by Descrierea și întrebuințarea apeĭ simple și a apelor minerale din Moldova ("Description and Use of Plain and Mineral Water in Moldavia", 1851) and Manualu pentru învățĕtura móșelor ("A Textbook of Midwife Instructions", 1852). At the time, he insisted, against religious observance and popular superstition, that women wash themselves as often as possible; he also began advocating a government-sponsored program of spa tourism, but his proposal was casually ignored. Fătu's hypothesis that sulfur baths could work against syphilis was more reserved than other claims to the same effect from his contemporaries, but nonetheless contributed to a prevailing mythology in later folk medicine.

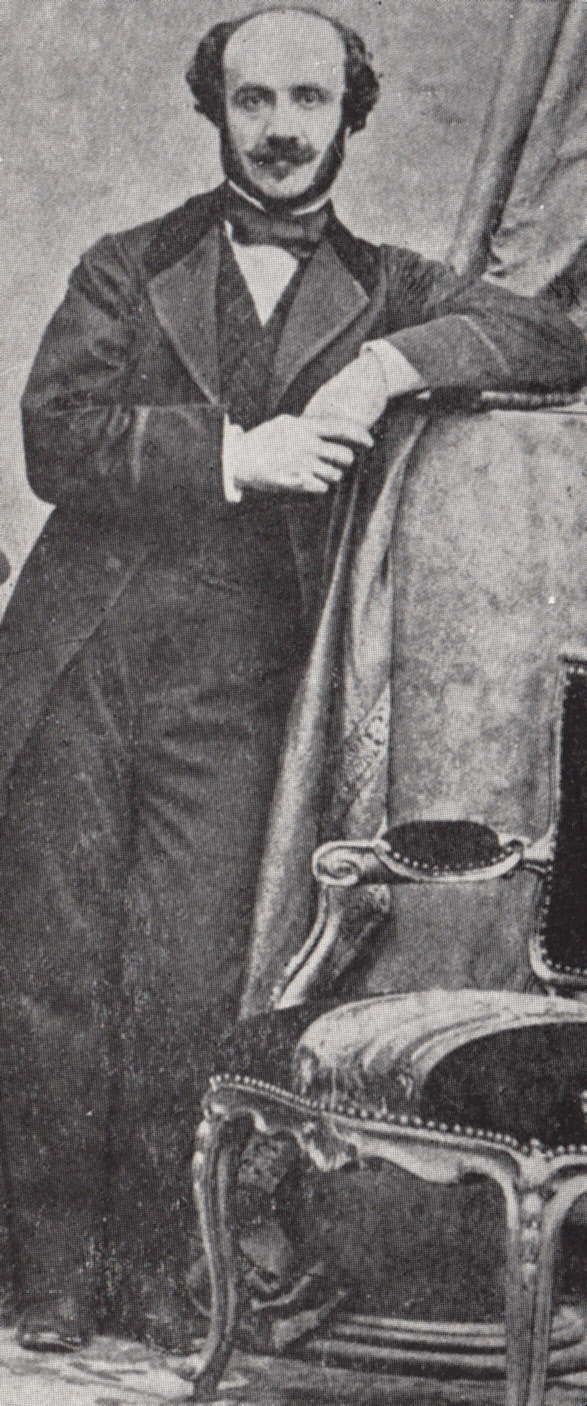
Photograph of Fătu, ca. 1860

In 1852, Ban Fătu established the Gregorian Institute (named for the patron-prince Ghica), which included a midwives' school that was at some point co-headed by Nicolae Negură. Its parallel function as a maternity hospital enraged conservatives such as Constantin Sion, who called it Ghica's "whore-house, the house of illegitimate births". Within this institution, doctors Fătu and Gheorghe Cuciureanu also pioneered pediatrics, and ran Moldavia's only pre-kindergarten for abandoned children. Fătu also created the Society for the Encouragement of Young Romanians to Study Abroad on March 22, 1855, providing it with a capital of 1,000 ducats from his own estate, and publishing its statutes as a brochure. The following year, he set up on his property at Râpa Galbenă the Iași Botanical Garden, celebrated as the very first one in the two Danubian Principalities (Moldavia and Wallachia). The collection, Fătu asserted, was meant to both improve the environment and educate the youth; upon inauguration, it comprised 2,500 plant species from several continents, as well as artificial ponds and greenhouses.

When the Crimean War toppled the Regulamentul Organic regime, placing the Danubian Principalities under the shared tutelage of Great Powers, Aga Fătu became marginally involved in the liberal and Romanian nationalist movement. By June 1856, he was a member of the enlarged Unionist Committee, which openly called for union between Moldavia and Wallachia. In February 1857, he joined a deputation sent by the Moldavian printers, asking the powers to lift censorship laws—other envoys were Vasile Alecsandri, Constantin Hurmuzachi, and Alecu Donici. He then ran in the elections of September, taking a seat for Iași in the ad hoc Divan. He was one of several affiliates of the National Party to win in that city, taking 198 votes. This new legislature, sanctioned by the Great Powers, replaced a Divan elected fraudulently in July.

The new chambers inaugurated a process whereby Fătu's Paris friend and National-Party favorite, Cuza, was elected the new prince of Moldavia—and then as Domnitor of the United Principalities (the basis for modern Romania). Fătu is known to have endorsed this move, and to have kept a portrait of the Domnitor in his residence. He returned to publishing in 1863 with Proiectu de Organisarea Policieĭ Sanitarĭâ in Romania ("A Project for Instituting Romania's Sanitary Police"), which also functioned as Romania's first attempt at a sanitary code. The same text pioneered medical jurisprudence, including the basics of mental health law and forensic science, sketched out food safety codes, regulated the creation of public toilets, and standardized the depth of graves. It also called for a ban on open-casket church funerals, proposing to isolate dead bodies under the close watch of specialized bailiffs. As social historian Constanța Vintilă-Ghițulescu remarks, Fătu's law integrated well within the "hygienist wave" of "civilized Europe", with doctors emerging as "key figures in the construction of the modern state." However, according to fellow hygienist Iacob Felix, the project was simply ignored by the government of Nicolae Kretzulescu, and the Assembly of Deputies consulted it only for laws establishing county councils.

=== Factionalist debut ===
Fătu returned to politics after Domnitor Cuza's ouster. By the time of the April 1866 election, he supported a project to remake the centralized state into a federal Romania, with separate Moldavian institutions. Drafted by lawyer Gheorghe Cigaras, it was endorsed by members of an emergent regional party, the Free and Independent Faction. Overall, Fătu sided with the Factionalists, who came to be headed by Nicolae Ionescu, and with Ion C. Brătianu's "Red" radicals, against moderate liberals and "White" conservatives. In Moldavia in particular, the central issue dividing society was that of Jewish emancipation: Factionalists, motivated by economic antisemitism, opposed the integration of Romanian Jews, whereas conservatives supported it. In May 1866, antisemitic riots implicating Faction members erupted in Iași, Bârlad, Roman and Botoșani. The clampdown by the authorities resulted in the temporary arrest of various Factionalists and allies: Fătu was picked up alongside Vasile Gheorghian, Alexandru Gheorghiu, Alecu D. Holban and Petru Poni.

Fătu then helped organize the November 1866 election, during which he proposed Cuciureanu, his former associate, as a candidate for the Senate. He himself won a deputy seat for the 2nd College of Iași County, and, in December, was elected one of four vice presidents of the Assembly, seconding Assembly Chairman Lascăr Catargiu. Reelected for the Iași 2nd College in December 1867, and propelled by an understanding between the "Reds" and the Factionalists, Fătu then became house chairman, elected with 80 votes of 105 on January 27, 1868. In this capacity, he notably abstained during the vote on railway concessions.

By April 1868, with anti-Jewish pogroms occurring at Bacău and elsewhere, Fătu and 30 other deputies presented an antisemitic law proposal, one radical enough to be criticized by Brătianu, who deemed it uncivilized. Claiming to be a law on "the regularization of the state of Jews in Romania", Fătu's project notably banned Jews from settling anywhere in the countryside, and also from purchasing land. Indirectly responsible for the fall of the Ștefan Golescu cabinet and a rift between the "Reds" and the Faction, this proposed legislation was at the center of an international scandal—not just because it discriminated against Jews, but also because it was retroactive in nature.

With General Nicolae Golescu succeeding his brother as head of the "Red" cabinet, the Faction began moving closer to the opposition "Whites". Fătu, however, remained friendly toward the "Reds". During May, as Ionescu took up filibustering in Senate, all Factionalist deputies but Fătu showed up to express their support. In June, going against the Factionalist party line, Fătu abstained from the Assembly's vote to depose Golescu—the Assembly went against the Senate, prompting a senatorial recall in early elections. Such developments also signaled Fătu's removal from the Assembly presidency, although, in November 1869, he was again elected as vice president (seconding Brătianu, alongside Grigore Arghiropol, Panait Donici, and C. A. Rosetti).

Taking up medical teaching at Socola Monastery seminary in 1869, by 1870 Fătu was editing the country's most prestigious research journal, Revista Șciințifică, with C. F. Robescu and Grigoriu Ștefănescu as fellow directors. This hosted his inventory of species in the Botanical Garden, which also came out as a standalone book in 1871. Also that year, he published at Socola a Manualu de medicină practică ("Textbook of Applied Medicine"). Reviewing the work in Revista Șciințifică, agronomist Petre S. Aurelian recorded as a "calamity" news that Fătu had been sacked from the seminary, by order of Christian Tell, the Education Minister in Dimitrie Ghica's "White" cabinet.

With the Free and Independent Faction, Fătu and Ionescu formed the more radical opposition to the "Whites", led at the time by Manolache Epureanu. Fătu ran in the elections of May 1870, one of 34 Factionalists to win Assembly seats: not enough to topple the Epureanu cabinet, but causing a great upset in national politics. Continuing to serve several terms in both the Assembly and Senate, Fătu remained an inconsistent Factionalist, only allied with the movement for part of his life; the movement itself was amorphous and notoriously opportunistic.

=== Academy work ===
On September 11, 1871, Fătu, Aurelian and Kretzulescu were elected to the Romanian Academy, or, as it was known back then, the "Romanian Academic Society", and thus founded a section for natural sciences. This honored the academicians' pledge of giving humanities and hard sciences equal exposure, after some 5 years of inactivity in that field; up to then, only Petrache Poenaru had been representing hard science at the Academy. His inaugural address, received for the Academy by Urechia and published in 1873, was titled Încercările pentru dezvoltarea sciintielorŭ naturale în România ("Attempts to Develop Natural Sciences in Romania"). According to a later review by geologist Ion Th. Simionescu, the speech was infused with Fătu's "love for his country". Fătu castigated "the inactivity and wrong direction" of Romanian scientific learning, and demanded direct intervention by the state—while praising private individuals who had compensated the lack of such support.

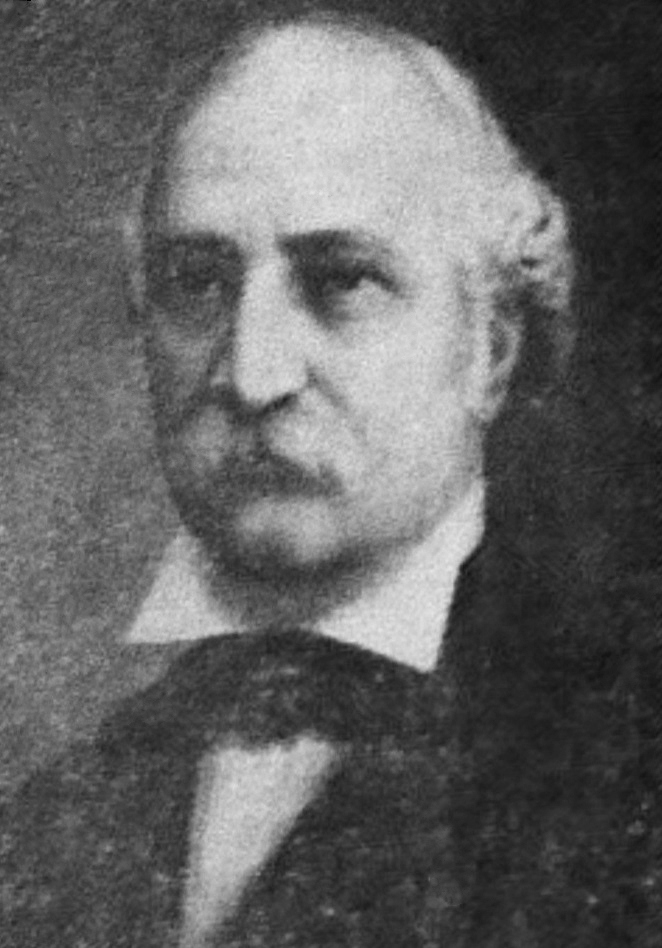
Fătu in old age

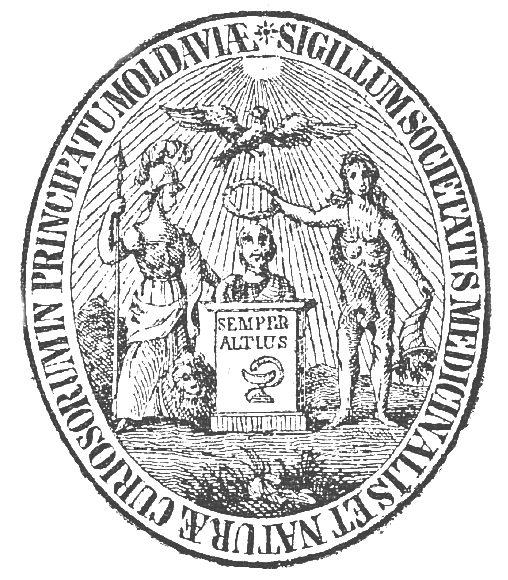
Seal of the Iași Medical and Naturalist Society

Although Factionalist politics had brought Fătu into conflict with another Iași-based institution, the conservative club Junimea, Încercările... included polite references to Junimism, honored for its commitment to the scientific method and to freedom of thought. At the Academy, Fătu and Alexandru Odobescu were coming to question the competence of its two leaders, August Treboniu Laurian and I. C. Massim. Fătu supported Odobescu and the Junimists' plea for phonemic orthography, and voted to audit Laurian's project for the Romanian Language Dictionary. He was spotted at Junimea meetings, one of the caracudă ("small game") section, who attended without participating. Alongside the Junimist Vasile Pogor, who was cashier of his Society for the Encouragement of Young Romanians to Study Abroad, Fătu also contributed money for Vasile Conta's tuition at Antwerp Business Institute; Conta, also a Junimea man, later sent him his manuscript collection of Romanian folklore.

Despite overcoming initial setbacks, the Academic Society was experiencing a financial impasse, which were felt especially hard by the science section. Partly in order to remedy this, in August 1872, Fătu donated 10,000 "new lei" for the creation of his eponymous fund, with prizes going to Romania's best scientific cartography, and also the entire collection of Revista Științifică. For a long time, however, no researcher applied to collect his prize. Also in August 1872, with Kretzulescu replacing Laurian as Academy chairman, Fătu became its vice president, in succession to Massim. On September 19, he was also elected president of the scientific section (serving to 1876). On the occasion, his fund was split into prizes for botany, agronomy, geology, chemical engineering, and balneotherapy. Moreover, Fătu and Petru Poni insisted on sponsoring a meteorological sub-section, which became operational in September 1874 and employed Ionescu de la Brad as one of the main surveyors. Fătu also helped Ionescu de la Brad set up his own (since lost) botanical garden, at Negri.

From 1872, Fătu was also president and re-organizer of the Iași Medical and Naturalist Society, which was working to establish a natural museum. Alongside fellow naturalist Dimitrie Brândză, he created a second, much smaller, botanical garden, near the museum building at Roset House, on Hagoaiei Street. At around the same time, he supported scholar Bonifaciu Florescu's short-lived project to set up an adult high school, also co-founding with him a Society for Teaching the Romanian People. In late May 1873, Fătu and other Factionalists (including Poni, Scarlat Pastia, Dimitrie Tacu, and Ștefan C. Șendrea) participated in agitation against the regime of Domnitor Carol I by organizing Cuza's ostentatious funeral at Ruginoasa.

As a senator, Fătu helped Felix promote a new project of sanitary law, which was eventually passed by both chambers in May 1874. It made sanitary inspection a function of Internal Affairs. In 1875, he produced Elemente de Botanica ("Elementary Botany"), Romania's first college textbook in that field, putting it up for Academy review. This was a groundbreaking initiative, because it standardized and affixed botanical notions in modern Romanian vocabulary. Eventually published as two volumes in 1878 and 1880, with Botanical Garden staff as editors, it was followed in 1885 by Elemente de Zoologie ("Elementary Zoology"). By then, Fătu had replaced Brândză as titular professor at the new Iași (Alexandru Ioan Cuza) University, where he simultaneously taught botany, physiology, and zoology.

=== Later years ===
Fătu on a 2026 stamp of Romania

At the time, Fătu also functioned as one of Iași's head physicians and curator (epitrop) of Sfântul Spiridon Hospital, publishing in 1873 a report on the foundation, its furnishings, and its work. This activity of his was coming under scrutiny from Junimea. The club's doyen, Titu Maiorescu, noted in 1875 that most of Fătu's contributions were not fully philanthropic, as he claimed and expected others to perform: "To work for money only, now there is something Dr. Fătu knows how to do, with those 2,800 francs he picks up at the botanical garden, and a similar sum from the Academic Society, and so much more from Sfântul Spiridon etc., and then he presents himself as a great patriot." Ultimately, in 1876, with Ion Ghica taking over as Academy chairman, Fătu was also replaced as vice president by George Bariț. In July of that year, selected by Poni and voted in by other inductees, he became a "special member" of the Medical and Naturalist Society, charged with curating its botanical fund.

Following the Romanian War of Independence, during elections for the Senate which opposed Junimea to a local chapter of the federated National Liberal Party, Fătu was one of the Factionalists who joined the latter. He thus ran on a list headed by Vasile Alecsandri, directly against Petre P. Carp. In his last years of activity, alongside Carol Davila, Fătu also contributed greatly to the consolidation of a Iași public Medical Faculty—nucleus of the Grigore T. Popa University of Medicine and Pharmacy. From 1881, he was a member of the Senckenberg Nature Research Society. In the new Kingdom of Romania, he still maintained an interest in other social and economic matters, and, in 1884, he was among the main contributors to Iași's first credit cooperative, founded by Xenopol. The same year, Ion Luca Caragiale published his political comedy, O scrisoare pierdută. According to a 1915 memoir by journalist George Panu, who had heard the play on its first reading, the timid and congenial character Zaharia Trahanache was inspired by Fătu; the latter had drawn Caragiale's mockery when, during one National Liberal meeting he presided at Iași, he had asked his colleagues to evacuate a rowdy drunk with the words: vă rog, onorabililor, dați afară pe stimabilul! ("I kindly ask, honorable gentlemen, that you please throw out the esteemed gentleman!"). Literary historian Șerban Cioculescu believes that the reality is more complex: "If [Fătu's] way of presiding upon sessions and some of his verbal tics have indeed inspired certain lines of Caragiale's comedy, they are not actually among Trahanache's main character traits, making him an original creation."

In September 1885, Fătu played host to Carol I, by then King of Romania, who visited the Medical and Naturalist Society. He withdrew from Sfântul Spiridon in 1885. Before his death, which came at Iași on March 15 (Old Style: March 3), 1886, he was working with a commission to organize the Iași Medical Congress. On March 21, he was buried at Iași, with funeral orations by doctors Emanoil Riegler, Alexandru A. Suțu, and Eugen Rizu; he had left the Academy "almost his entire fortune". In his own admission speech in 1887, replacement Grigore Cobălcescu, his "heart filled with sorrow", paid homage to "the late Anastasie Fetu".

However, Fătu's overall pedagogical work had inconclusive results: in 1900, Simionescu noted that very little had been done to address the issues he had raised in his 1873 speech, and that Fătu himself was "forgotten". Although Fătu was known affectionately to his fellow citizens as Dr. Buruienescu ("Dr. Weeds"), his garden was left in near-complete disrepair in the months after his death. As noted in 1976 by botanist Mandache Leocov, the project was resumed by Brândză, but again abandoned; a permanent botanical garden was only formed in 1963, and had Leocov himself as curator. The Medical and Naturalist Society was also in disarray: Fătu had kept its records and funds in his private home, and his widow Ecaterina and family would not renounce control over them. A legal dispute followed, and the Fătus were forced to relinquish control—although, reportedly, some manuscripts were never returned. By March 1892, Ecaterina Fătu and her two minor children had also lost ownership of the family estate in Drăgușeni, Dorohoi County, as Anastasie had died without reimbursing a credit worth 200,000 lei.
