= Gheorghe Teleman =

Romanian general

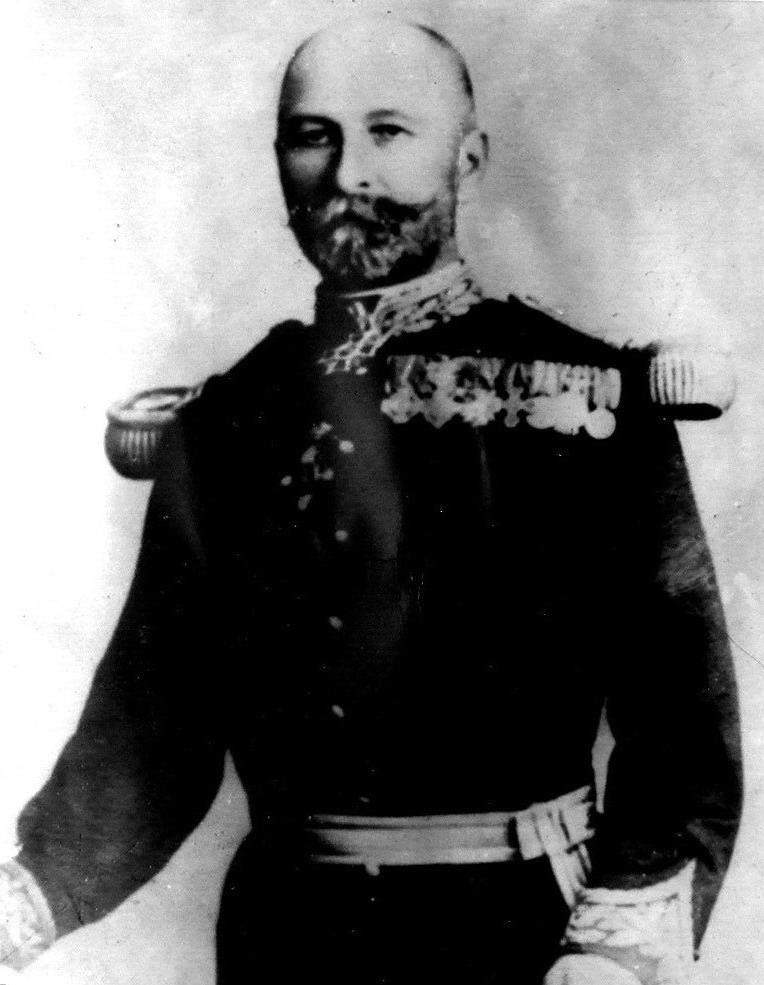
General Gheorghe Teleman

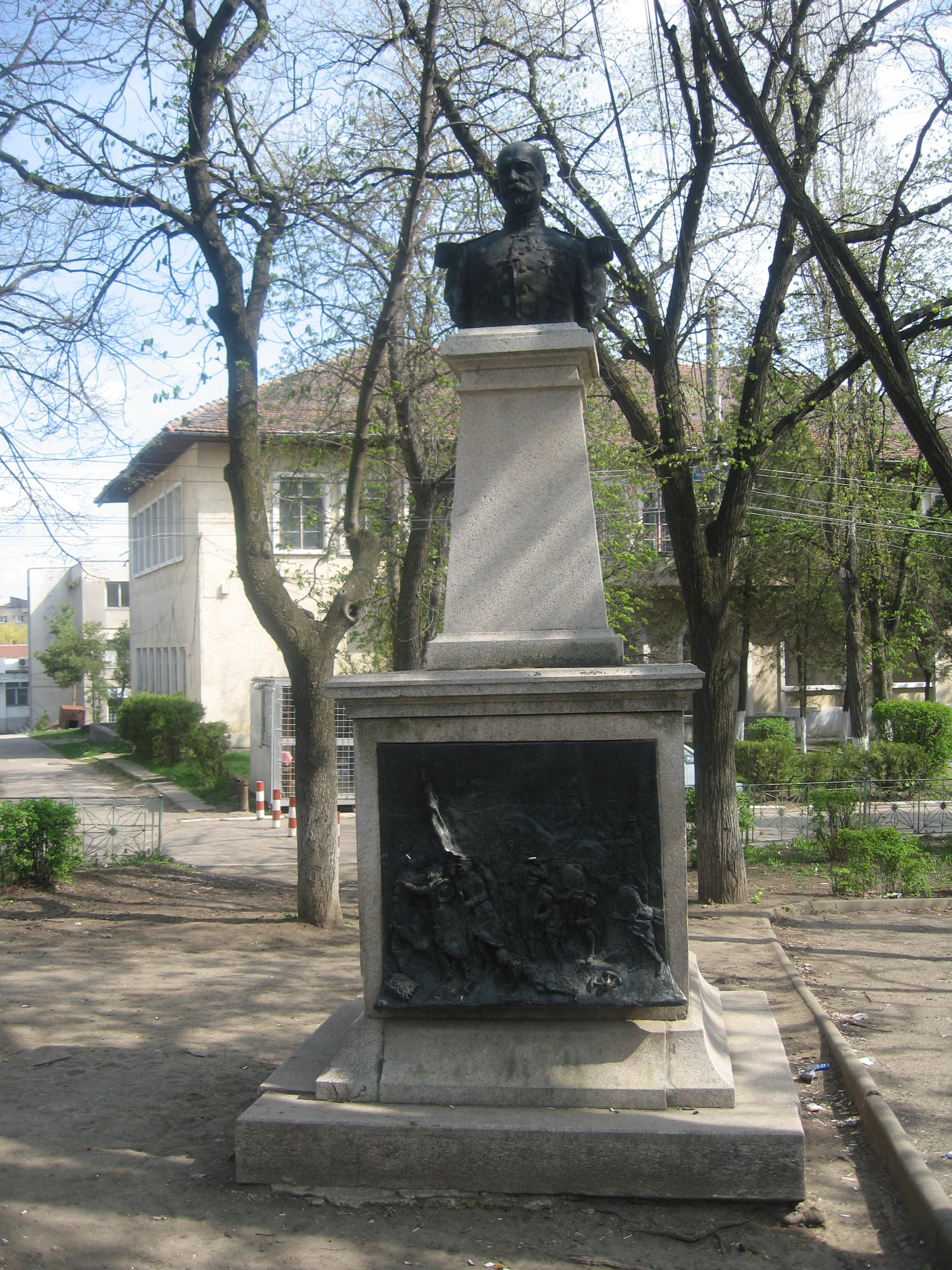
Bust of Teleman in Huși

Gheorghe Teleman (22 October 1838–4 July 1913) was a Romanian general, born in Huși.

He took part in the Smârdan attack during the Russo-Turkish War of 1877–1878, and was decorated for bravery. A member of the Conservative Party, he served as representative of Huși in the Romanian Senate and Chamber of Deputies, mayor of the city, as well as prefect of Fălciu County.

The 202nd CBRN Chemical Battalion, founded on 20 October 1950 with headquarters in Huși, is named after him.
