= Iași Botanical Garden =

Garden in Romania

Coordinates: 47°11′13.74″N 27°33′23.61″E

Anastasie Fătu Botanical Garden
- Grădina Botanică "Anastasie Fătu"
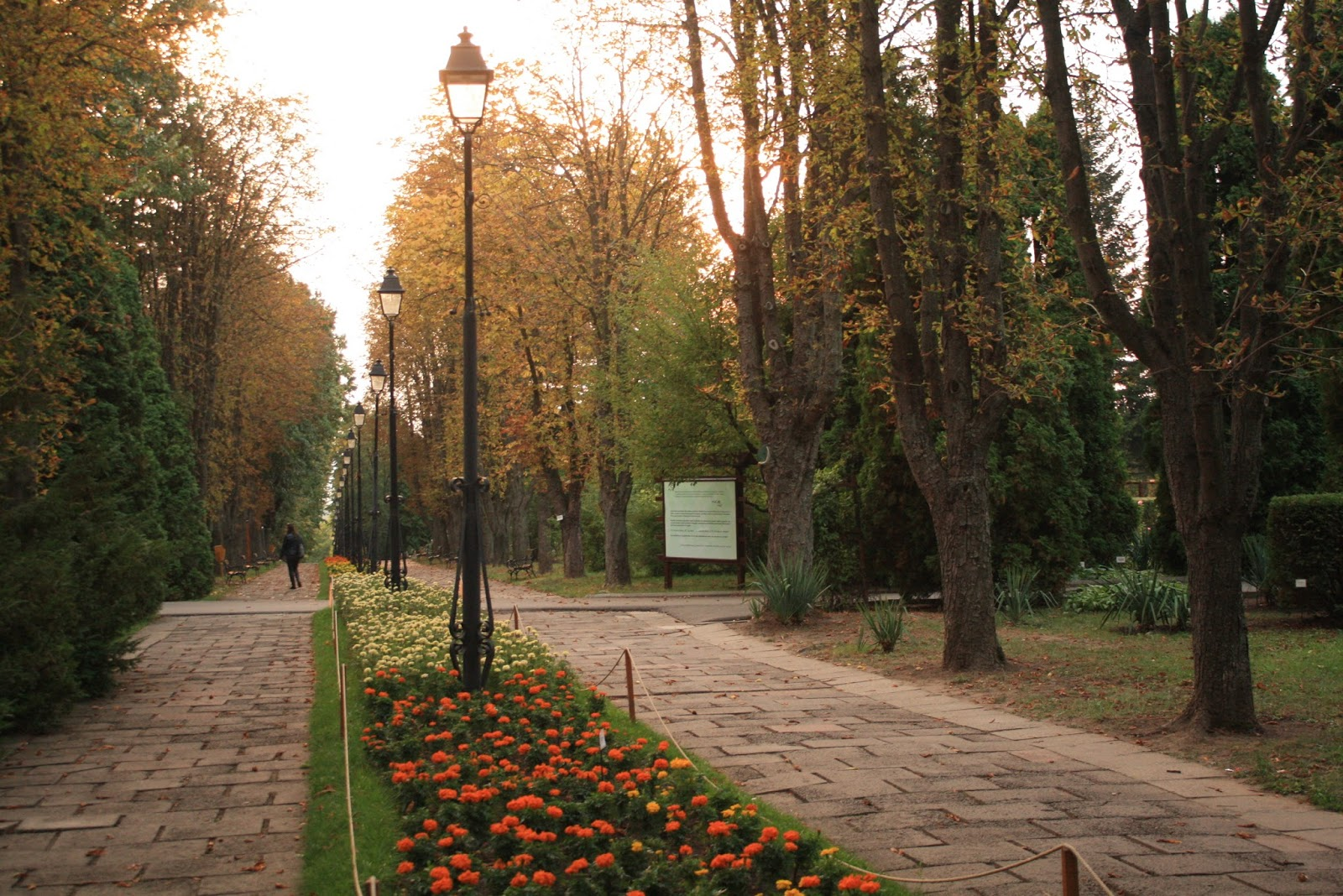
- Interactive map of Anastasie Fătu Botanical Garden
- Type: Botanical garden, Public park
- Location: Iași, Romania
- Area: 82 ha (200 acres)
- Created: 1856
- Operator: Alexandru Ioan Cuza University
- Website: botanica.uaic.ro

The Iași Botanical Garden, now named after its founder, Anastasie Fătu (Romanian: Grădina Botanică "Anastasie Fătu"), is a botanical garden located in the Copou neighbourhood of Iași, Romania. Established in the year 1856 and maintained by the Alexandru Ioan Cuza University, it is the oldest and largest botanical garden in Romania.

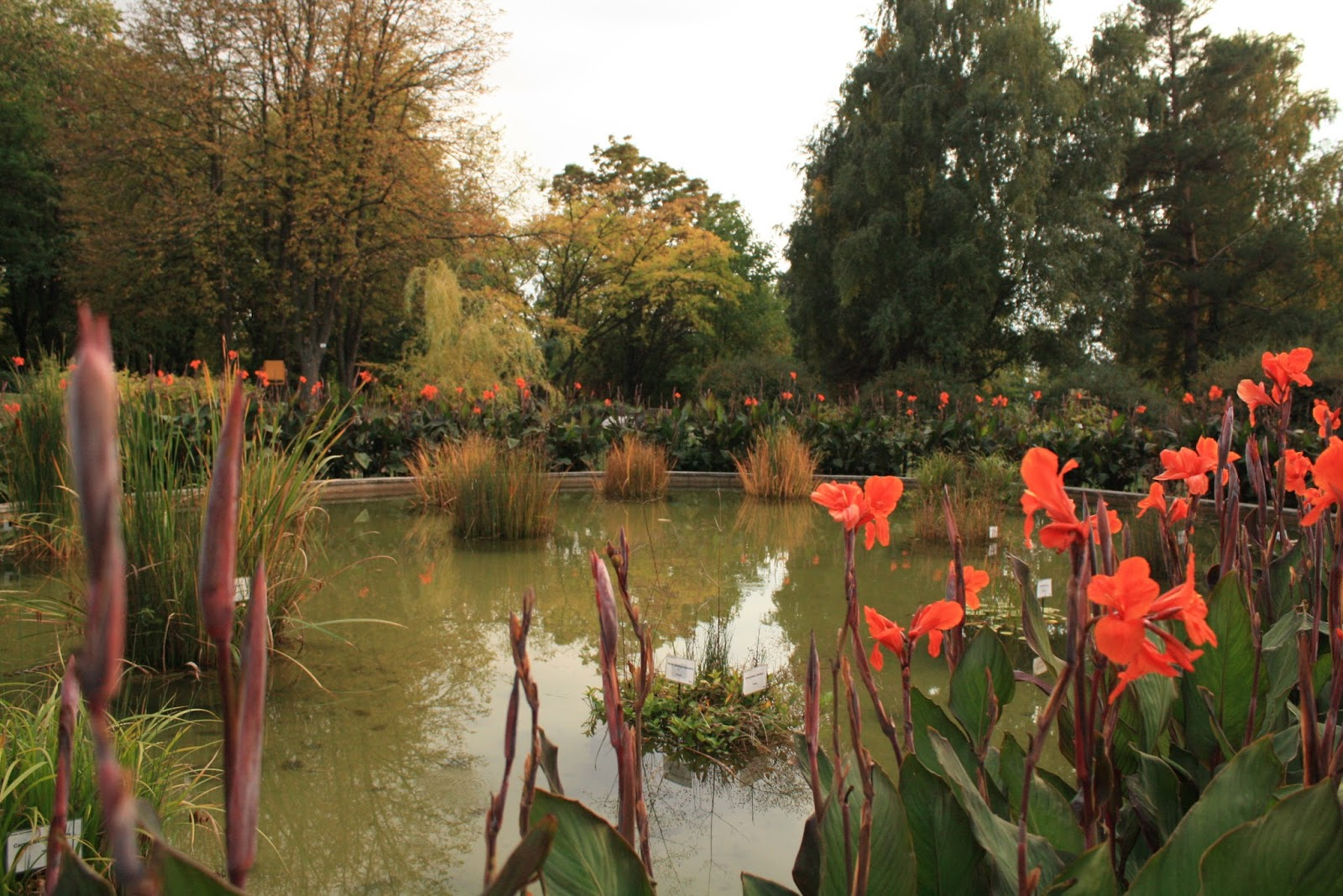
The small pond (autumn 2015)

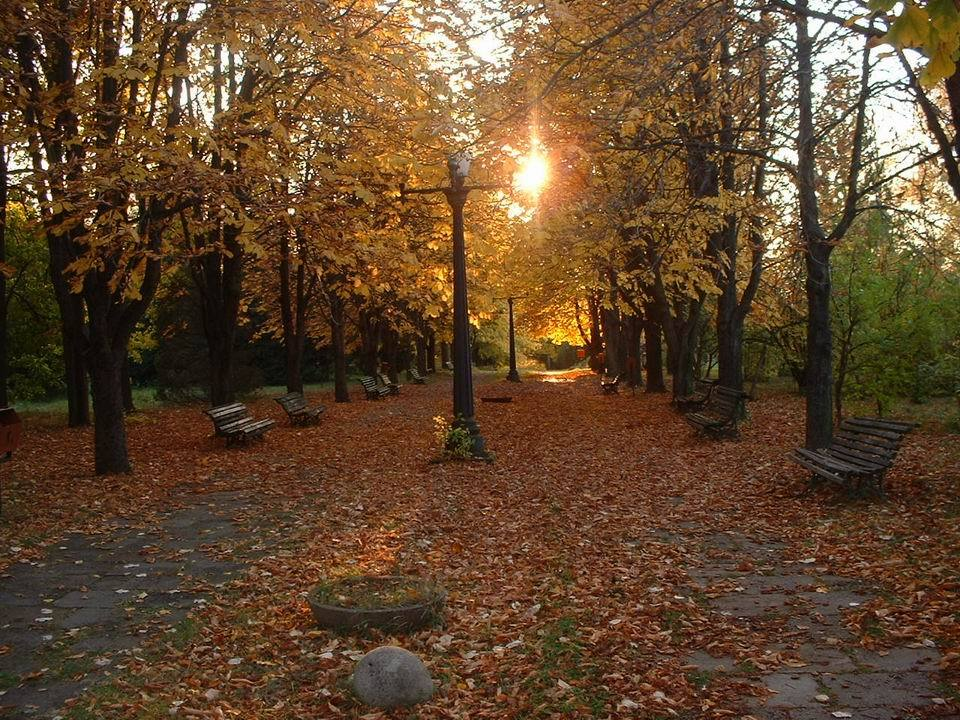
An alley near the entrance to the garden's grounds

== History ==
In 1856, in the immediate vicinity of Râpa Galbenă, Anastasie Fătu founded the Iași Botanical Garden with land bought using his own funds. In 1873, stimulated by interest expressed in Anastasie Fatu's garden, the Physicians and Naturalists Society founded a second botanical garden near the society; the second garden is now the natural history museum.

In 1870, the Grigore T. Popa University of Medicine and Pharmacy (then University of Iași) created its own botanical garden on a piece of land located behind the university. In 1900, after five years of pleading from Professor Alexandru Popovici, the university asked for land near the Palace of Culture to establish a new botanical garden there. Repeated attempts to obtain the necessary funding to realize this garden proved fruitless. In 1921, Alexandru Popovici organized a new botanical garden on land located at the back of the new university building. This garden served the botanical education over forty years, until 1964, when it was eventually moved to its current location in Copou, under the supervision of Professor Emilian Ţopa.

The Iaşi Botanical Garden is currently involved in the conservation of eighty-five separate species included in the Red Book of the vascular plants from Romania and in international conventions. It is also in partnership with in-site conservation programs developed for plants species from the Carpathian Mountains and the Danube Delta. The botanical garden co-operates with partners from Romania and abroad. Since 2009, it has been a member of the International Plant Exchange Network.

== Grounds ==
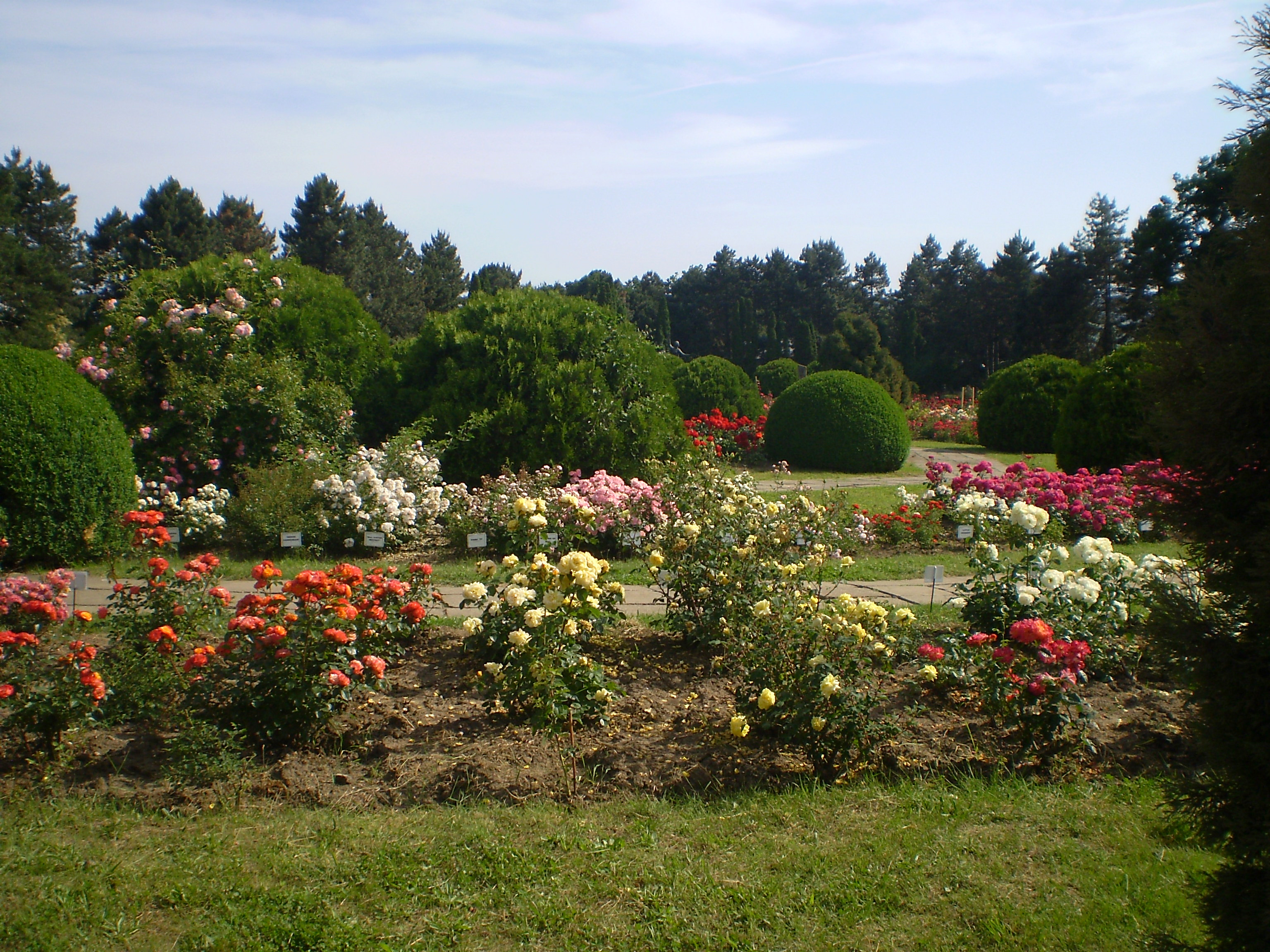
The Rosary Section

The garden spans over 80 hectares of land and is divided into twelve areas.

- The Systematic Section is meant for students and is on a 4.5-hectare (11-acre) area, with 700 herbaceous and lignaceous taxa that are cultivated and distributed according to their natural similarities in divisions, orders and families.
- The Romanian Flora and Vegetation Section is the largest section, with a 25-hectare (62-acre) area, and is divided into six geographical sub-sections: Moldova, Transylvania, Banat, Muntenia, Oltenia, Dobruja. It represents, on the vertical, the main types and zones of vegetation from Romania and, on the horizontal, the flora and vegetation of each Romanian historical province.
- The Ornamental Section, covering a 4-hectare (9.9-acre) area in open air, plus 500 square metres (5,400 sq ft) in the greenhouses complex and solariums, was designed for the species needing warm spaces. This area has a subsection for the blind.
- The Dendrologic Section is situated on a versant presenting western general exposition, on 20-hectare (49-acre) area. It has a collections of trees and shrubs which have been grouped together taking into account the genera that are including the respective species and also the ecological requests of the plants.
- The World Flora Section has a general image of the flora from different geographic regions of the Earth, with plants cultivated on 16-hectare (40-acre), and grouped taking into account their origin and distributed according to the natural and mixed landscape architecture styles.
- The Biologic Section, presents, on an area of 4.5-hectare (11-acre), aspects of the vegetal world organization, aspects of plants evolution and adaptation to the environmental conditions and the role of humans in the directing of the evolutive process in spirit of nature conservation and environment preservation.
- The Useful Plants Section is divided into nine subsections, and presents approximately 1.5-hectare (3.7-acre) of valuable plants species used in pharmaceutical, alimentary, cellulose, paper, or textile industries.

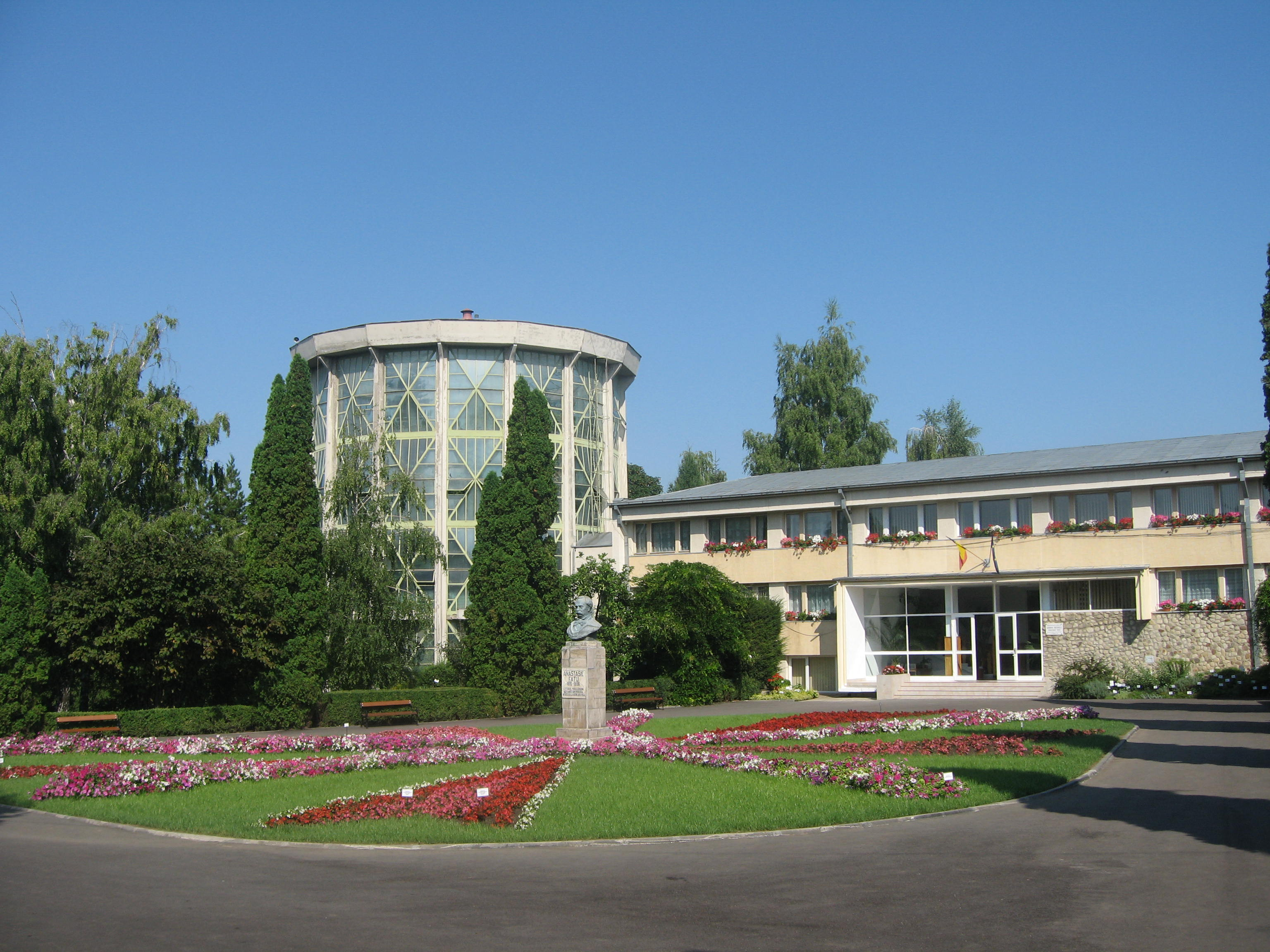
The Greenhouse Section

- The Greenhouses Complex Section, on about 5,500 square metres (59,000 sq ft), includes 21 greenhouses (out of which 11 can be visited), which shelter plant collections (approximate 2500 taxa) native especially of sub-tropical, tropical and equatorial zones of the globe, from all the continents.
- The Rosary Section (the Rose–Garden), on 1.7-hectare (4.2-acre), groups together approximately 600 varieties of roses, distributed in horticultural groups, taking into account their proportions, forms and colors.
- The Memorial Plants Section, on 3-hectare (7.4-acre), presents a series of plants related to important events of the human existence (the birth, the marriage and the death), a series of species related to some national personalities, to the life of the heroes from Romanian people. The species presenting names were inspired by various deities that, in the ancient Indo-European mythologies, could have had an important role in the appearance, development and evolution of human society;
- The Recreative Section, with an approximately 6-hectare (15-acre) area, offers the relaxing scenery of the vineyards and the orchards situated on the neighboring hills.
- The Experimental Section includes four sub-sections and represents, on 2-hectare (4.9-acre), a laboratory where students do practical work and scientific research.

== Access ==
Access to the Iaşi Botanical Garden is through the main gate, at the eastern edge of the grounds, adjacent to the Exhibition Park (Romanian: Parcul Expoziţiei). The greenhouses are closed on Mondays and Wednesdays.

== Gallery ==
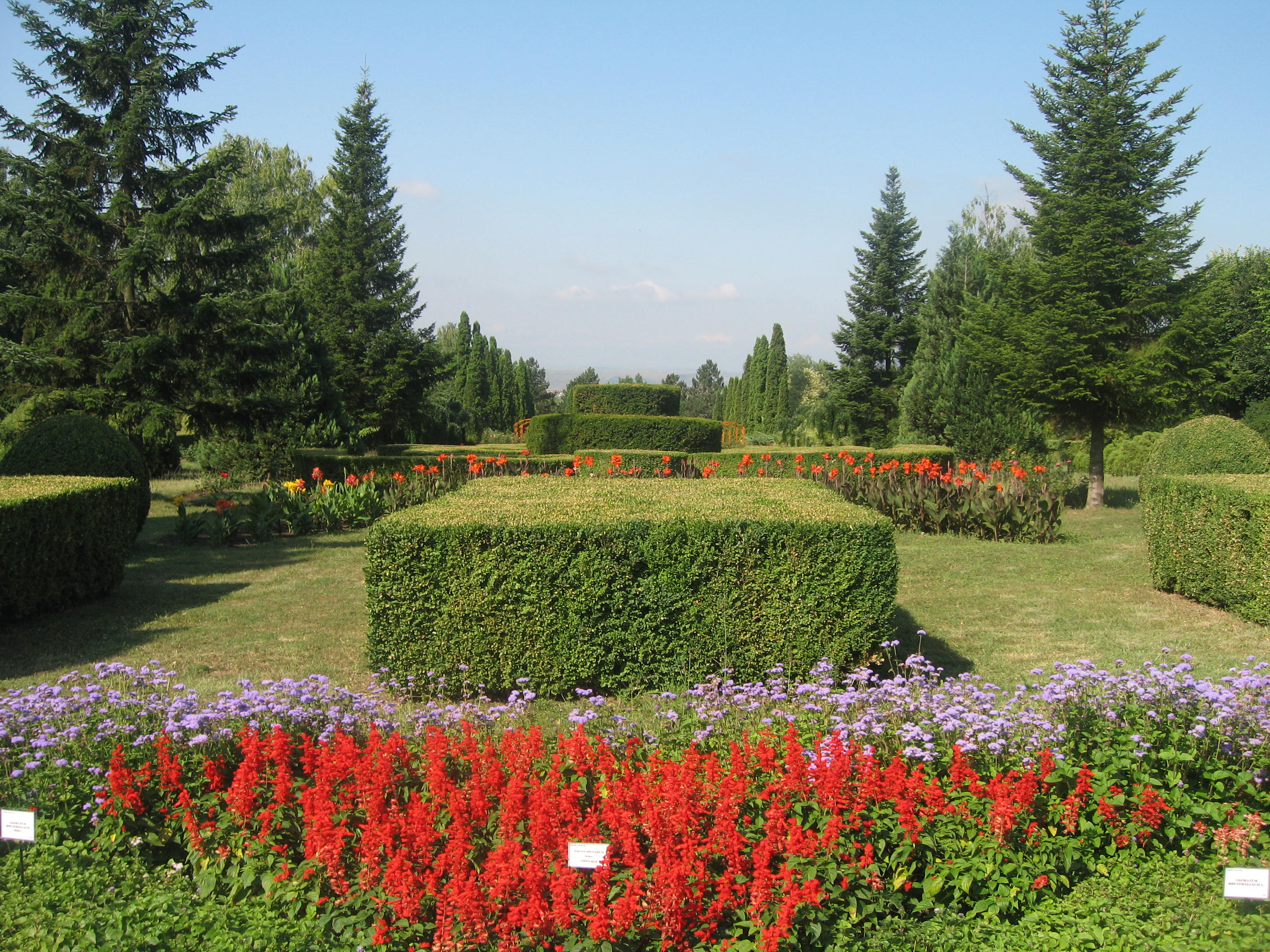
The Iaşi Botanical Garden

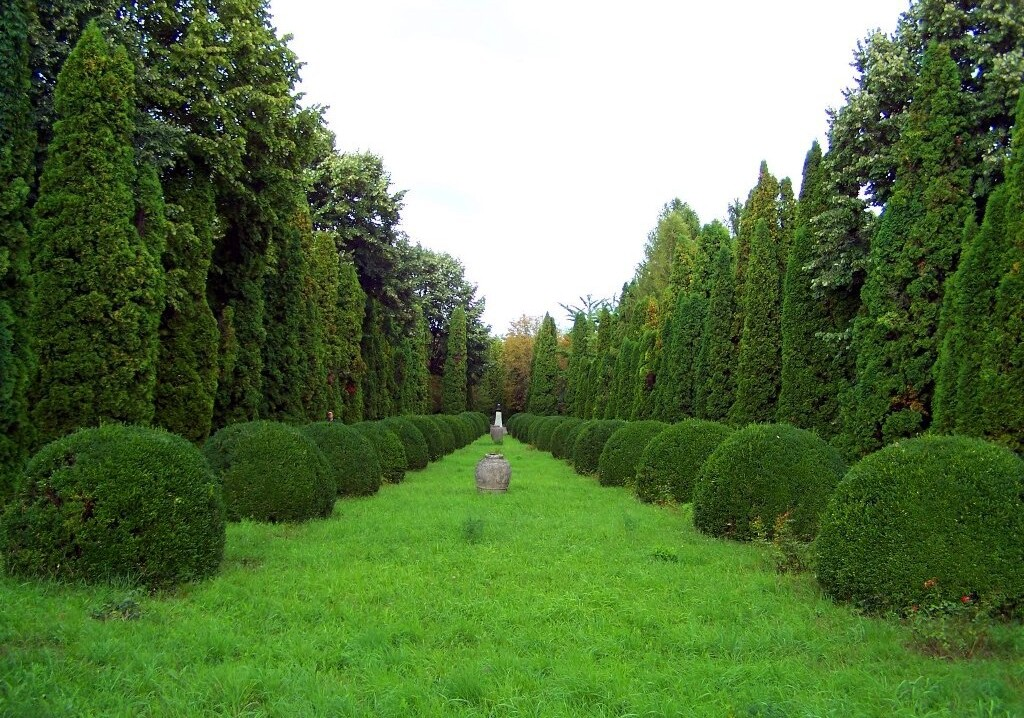
The Iaşi Botanical Garden

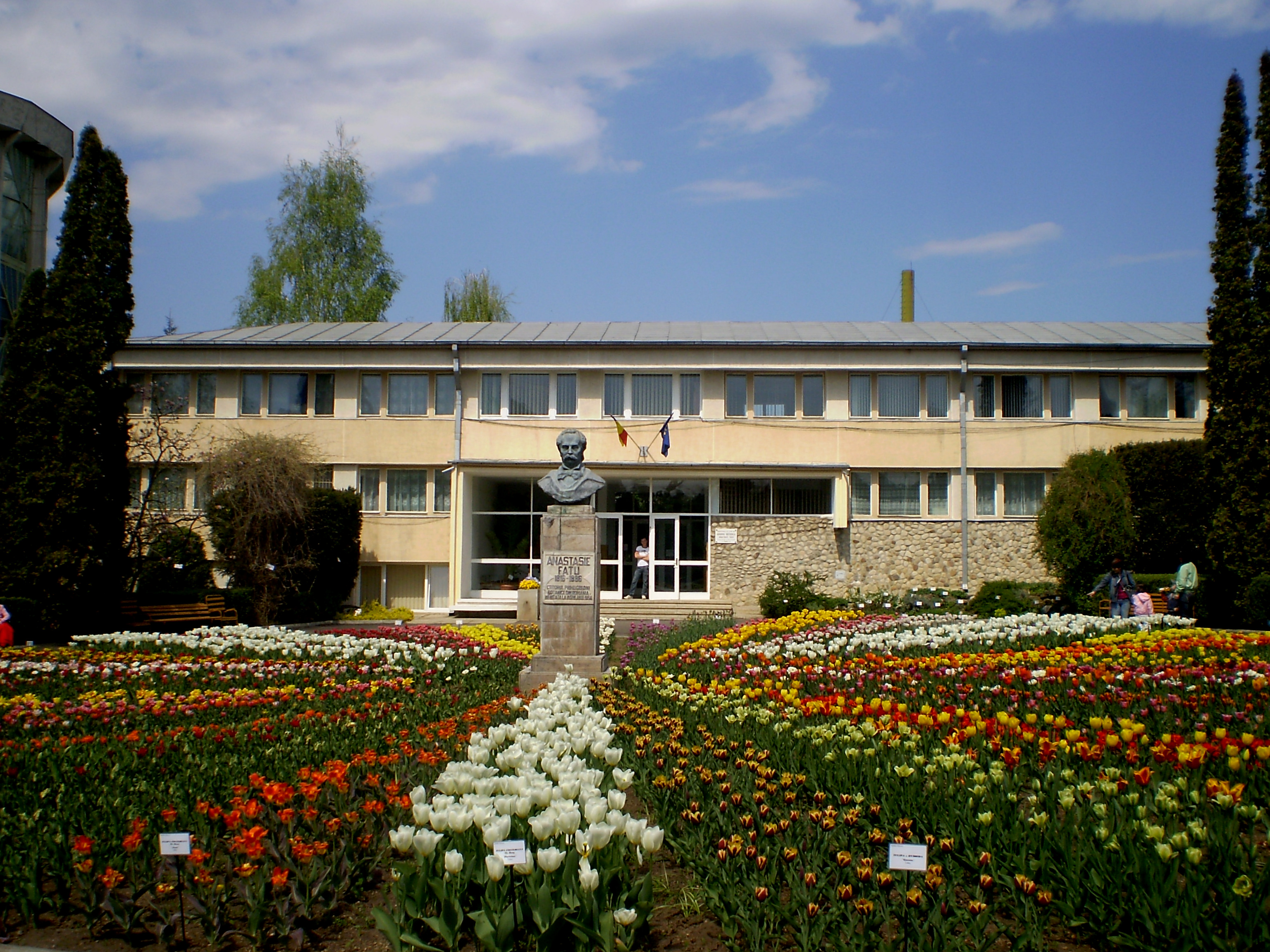
The office buildings and museum entrance

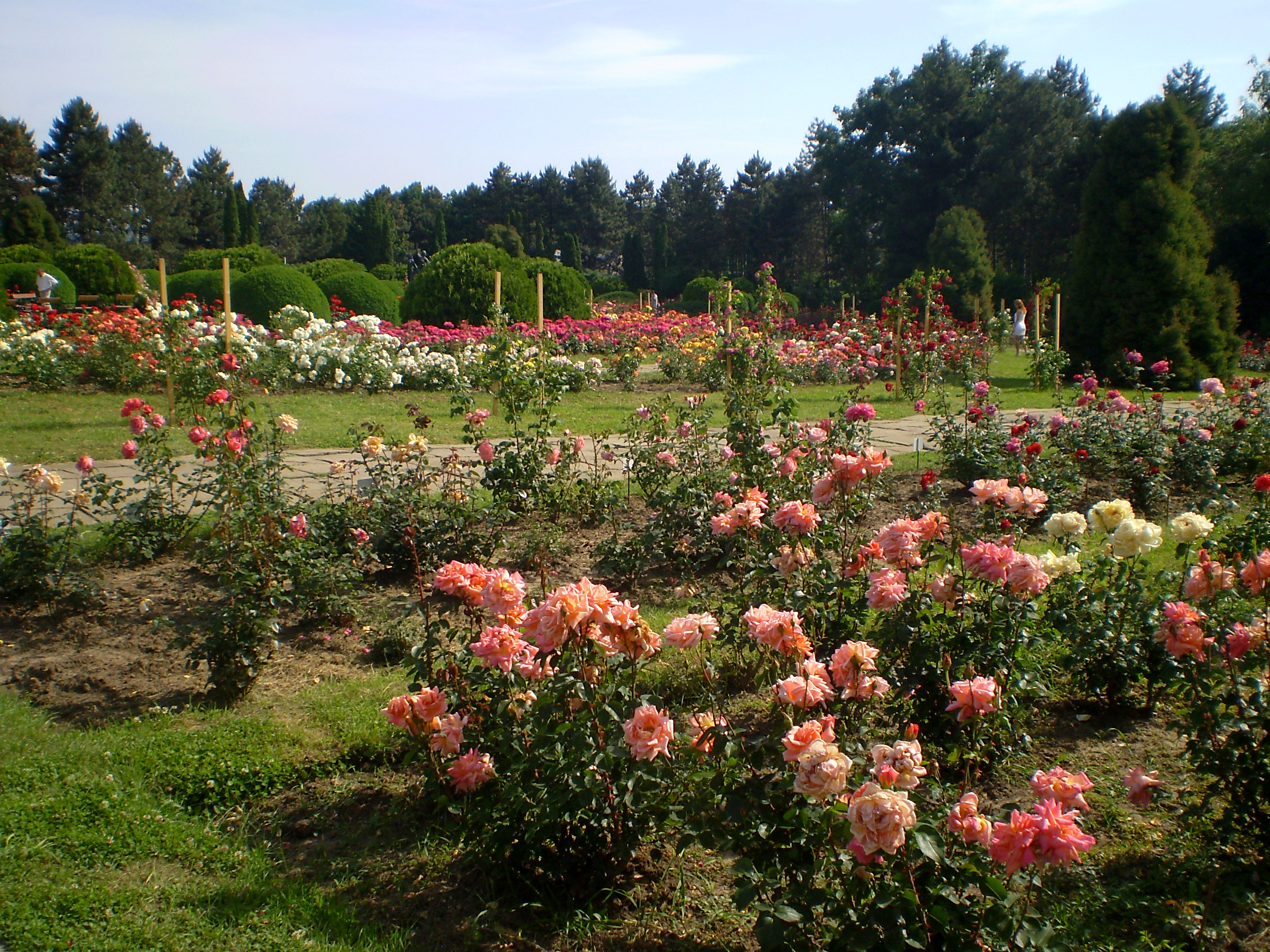
Rosary

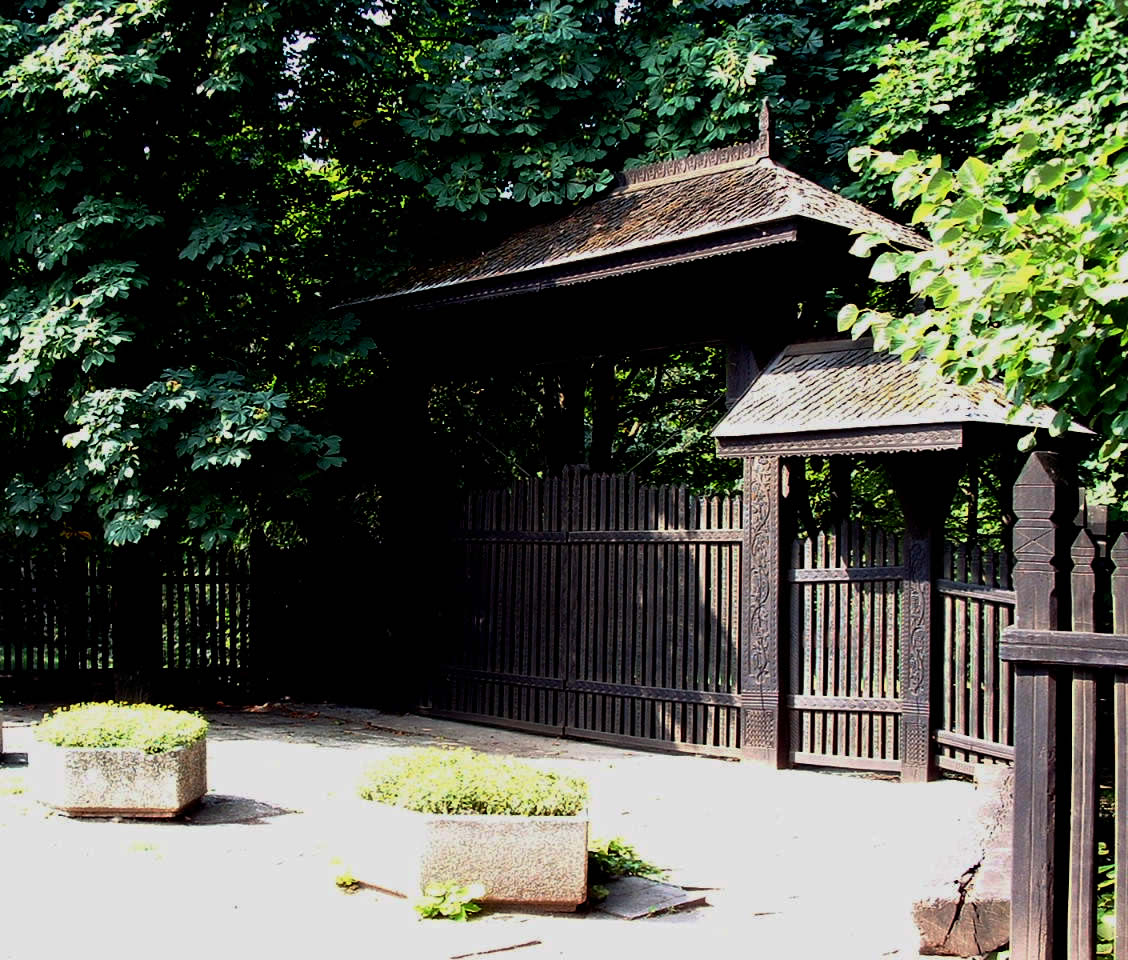
The main eastern gate to the gardens
