= Berezeni =

- Commune
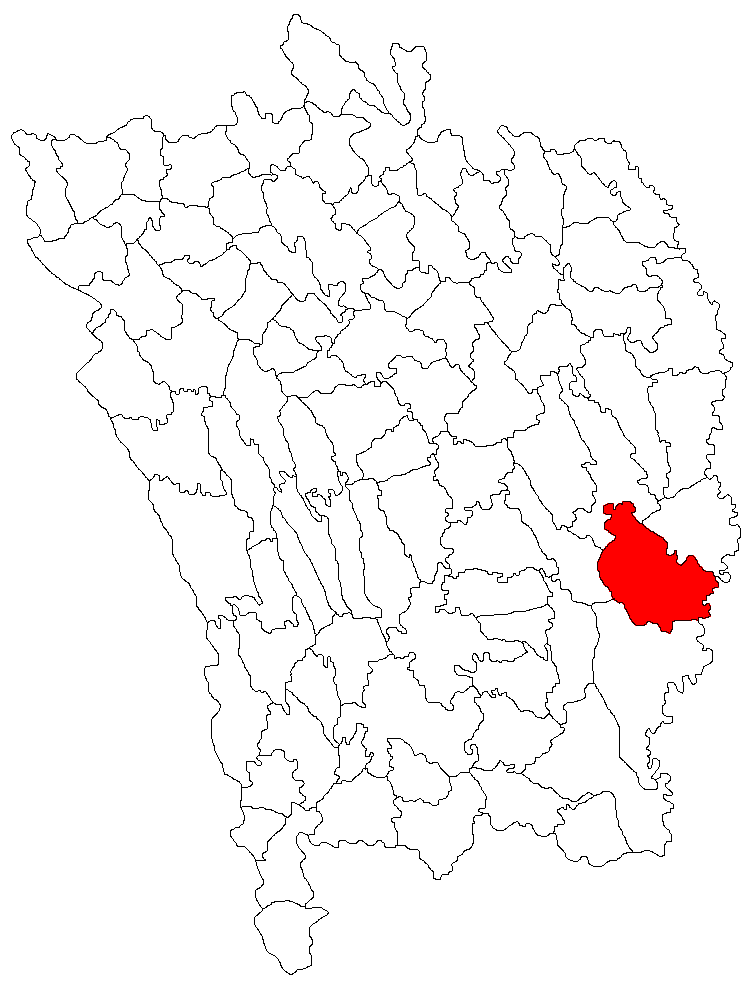
- Location in Vaslui County

- Location in Romania
- Coordinates: 46°22′34″N 28°08′52″E
- Country: Romania
- County: Vaslui
- Subdivisions: Berezeni, Mușata, Rânceni, Satu Nou, Stuhuleț

Government
  - Mayor (2020–2024): Toader Dima (PSD)
- Population (2021-12-01): 4,487
- Time zone: EET/EEST (UTC+2/+3)
- Vehicle reg.: VS

Berezeni is a commune in Vaslui County, Western Moldavia, Romania. It is composed of five villages: Berezeni, Mușata, Rânceni, Satu Nou, and Stuhuleț.

== Natives ==
- Anastasie Fătu (1816–1886), physician, naturalist, philanthropist, and political figure
