= Nicolae Negură =

Moldavian-born Romanian physician

Nicolae Negură (October 22, 1832–September 1884) was a Moldavian-born Romanian medical doctor.

Born in Huși, Negură studied medicine in Germany, where he was influenced by the materialism of Carl Vogt, Jacob Moleschott and Ludwig Büchner. He received a doctorate in 1856 from the University of Berlin; the thesis was titled De febre Moldaviensi. Later that year, he settled in the Moldavian capital Iași, obtaining a license to practice and obtaining a post as a primary care physician at Sfântul Spiridon Hospital. In September 1859, at a time when medical education in Moldavia was limited to a midwives' school, he proposed that the Ministry of Religious Affairs and Public Instruction set up a school for surgeons that would serve as the basis for a medical faculty. After receiving ministerial approval, he proceeded within a year to translate and publish a manual of anatomy and to obtain necessary materials such as a microscope, normal and diseased anatomical samples, skeletons and plaster casts. He had the support of domnitor Alexandru Ion Cuza, and of Mihail Kogălniceanu.

At the end of November, Negură was able to begin teaching in the Academia Mihăileană building. The following January, he was named professor of surgery and medicine by princely decree. Certain circles, consolidated around the Sfântul Spiridon administration, opposed his initiative, but Negură was able to complete the 1860–1861 academic year. However, opposition then forced the school to shut down. Although ephemeral, it marked an important stage in the evolution of medical education in Romania.

Negură's philosophical writings offer a clue to his motivation in creating the school. His 1865 articles "Viața, existența și moartea" and "Voința, putința și răbdarea" mark him as an early Romanian promoter of a material conception about nature and thought. He also published Migrenă, an 1868 study of migraines; and Higienă publică și privată (1875), a hygiene manual. He was an active member of the Iași society of physicians and naturalists. Moving to Bucharest around 1865, he offered courses on forensic medicine and toxicology at the national school of medicine and pharmacy.
