= Dicționarul Limbii Române =

Dicționarul Limbii Române ("The Romanian Language Dictionary"), abbreviated DLR, also called Thesaurus Dictionary of the Romanian Language, is the most important lexicographical work of the Romanian language, developed under the aegis of the Romanian Academy during more than a century. It was compiled and edited in two stages (known under the brand DA series during 1906–1944 and new series, DLR, from 1965 to 2010), in 37 volumes and contains about 175,000 words and variations, with more than 1,300,000 quotes. The development of electronic version was made in 2007–2010.

This dictionary by size and perspective lexicographical approach is similar to the major dictionaries of world lexicography: Oxford English Dictionary (OED), Trésor de la langue française, Deutsches Wörterbuch etc.
