= Huși =

- Municipality
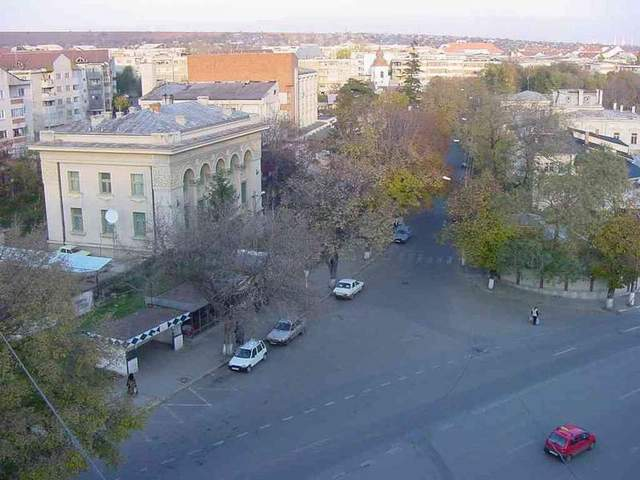
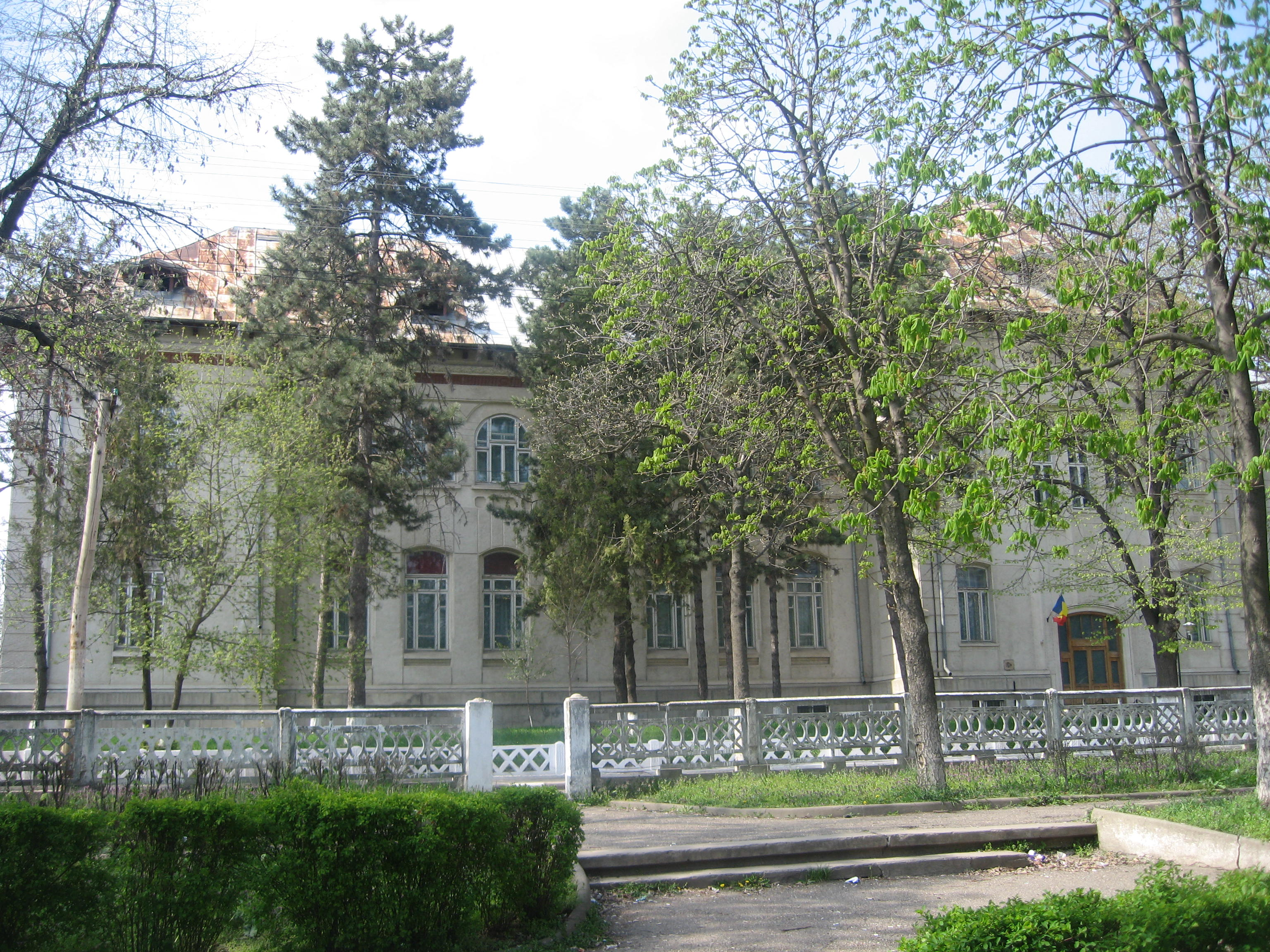
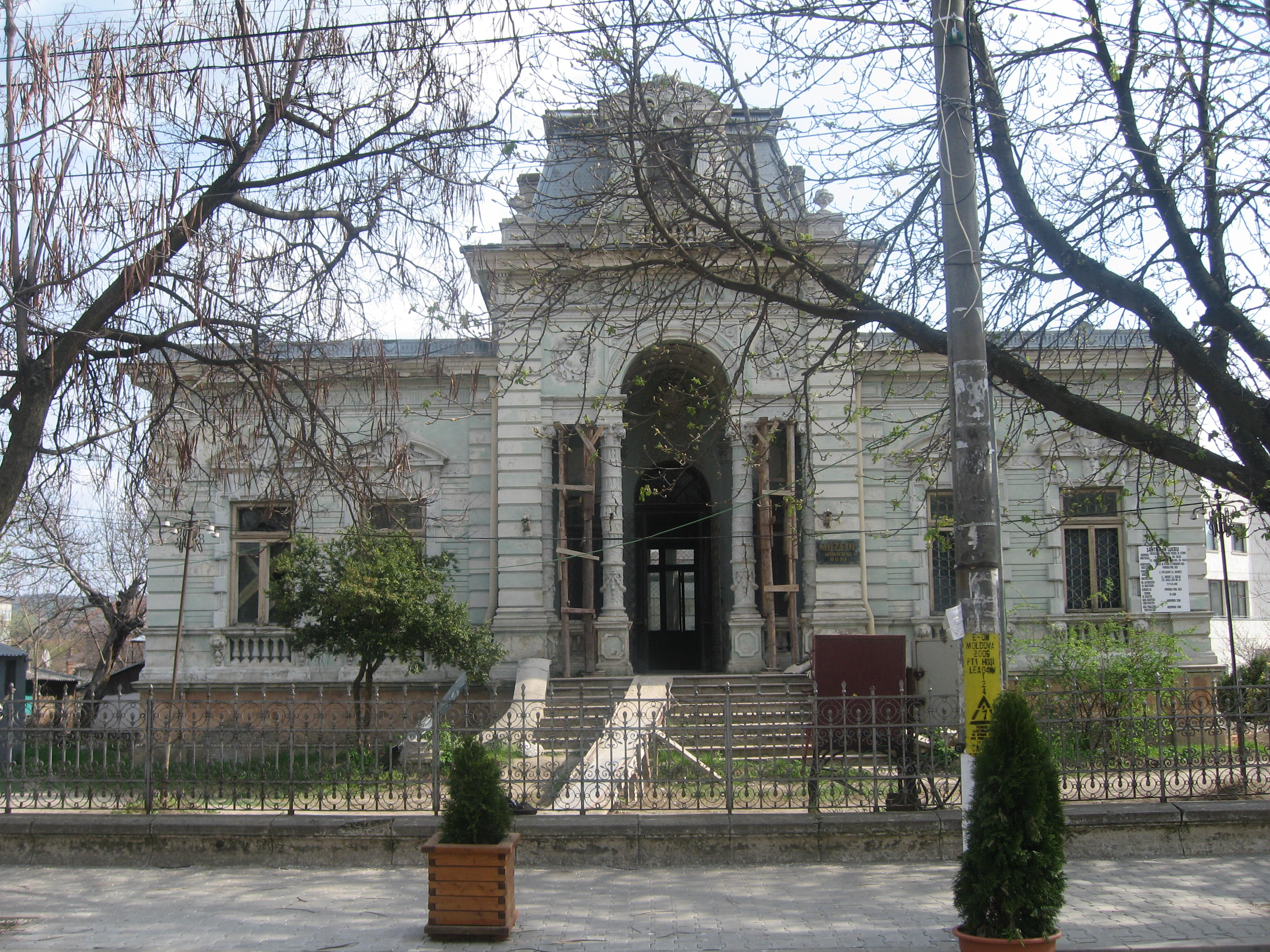
- View of the city Cuza Vodă National College Adam Mitache House Huși bishopal complex

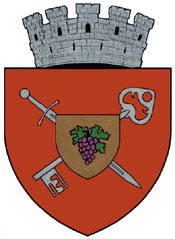
- Coat of arms

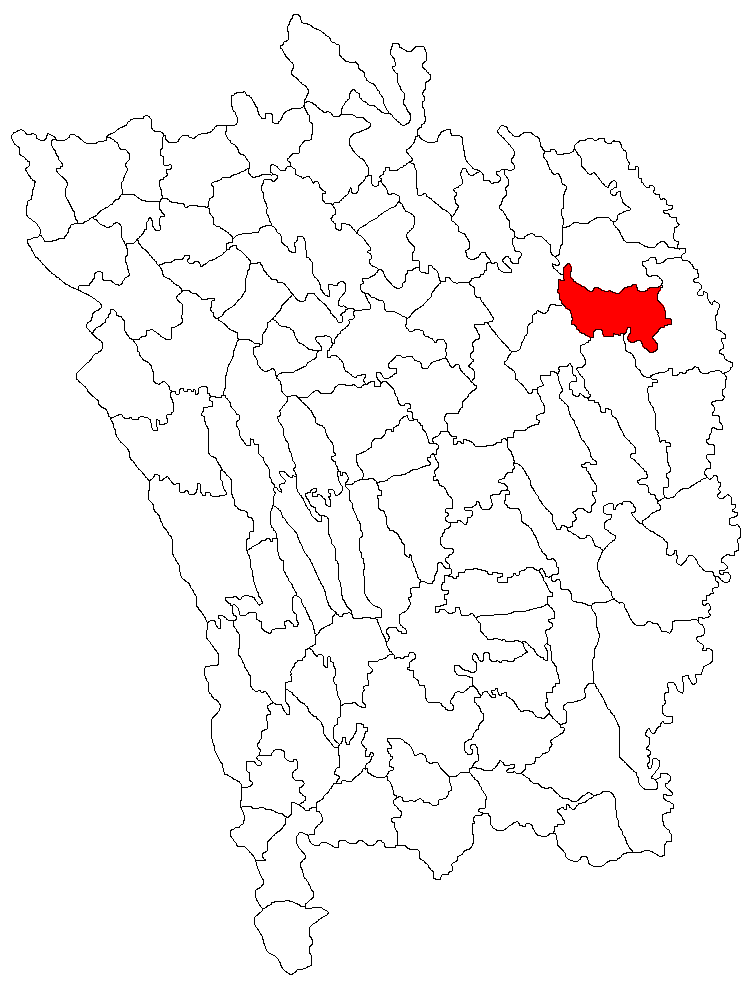
- Location in Vaslui County

- Location in Romania
- Coordinates: 46°40′27″N 28°3′35″E
- Country: Romania
- County: Vaslui
- Established: 1487 (first official record)

Government
  - Mayor (2024–2028): Ioan Ciupilan (PSD)
- Area: 61.12 km^{2} (23.60 sq mi)
- Elevation: 120 m (390 ft)
- Population (2021-12-01): 25,045
  - Density: 409.8/km^{2} (1,061/sq mi)
- Time zone: UTC+02:00 (EET)
  - Summer (DST): UTC+03:00 (EEST)
- Postal code: 735100
- Area code: (+40) 02 35
- Vehicle reg.: VS
- Website: www.primariahusi.ro

Huși (Romanian pronunciation: [huʃʲ], Yiddish/Hebrew: הוש/Hush, Hungarian: Huszváros, German: Hussburg) is a city in Vaslui County, Romania, former capital of the disbanded Fălciu County in the historical region of Western Moldavia, Romanian Orthodox episcopal see, and home of some of the best vineyards of Romania. The city is located on a branch of the Iași–Galați railway, fourteen kilometres (9 mi) west of the Prut River and the border with the Republic of Moldova. As of 2021, it had a population of 25,045.

== History ==
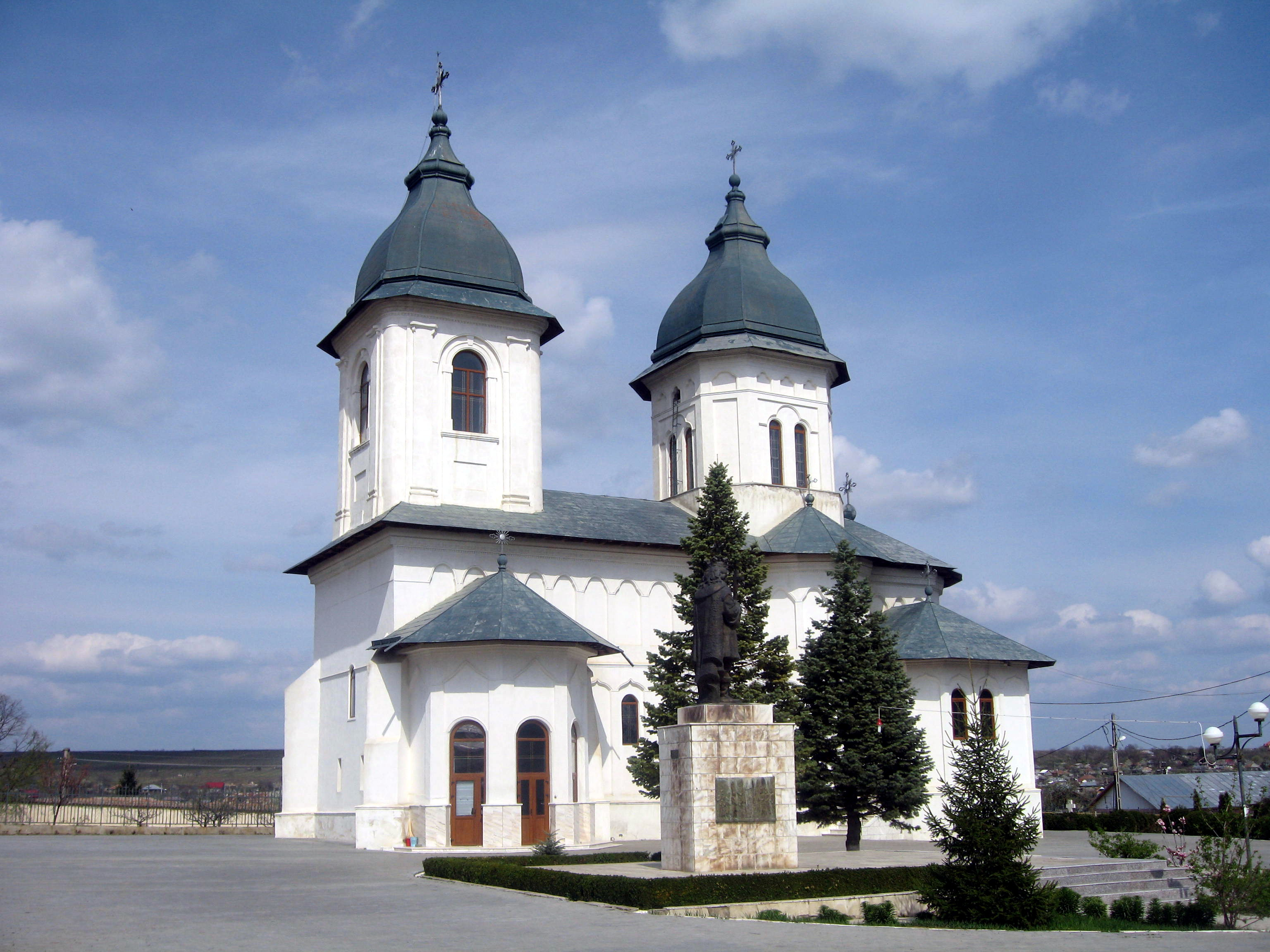
Episcopal Cathedral

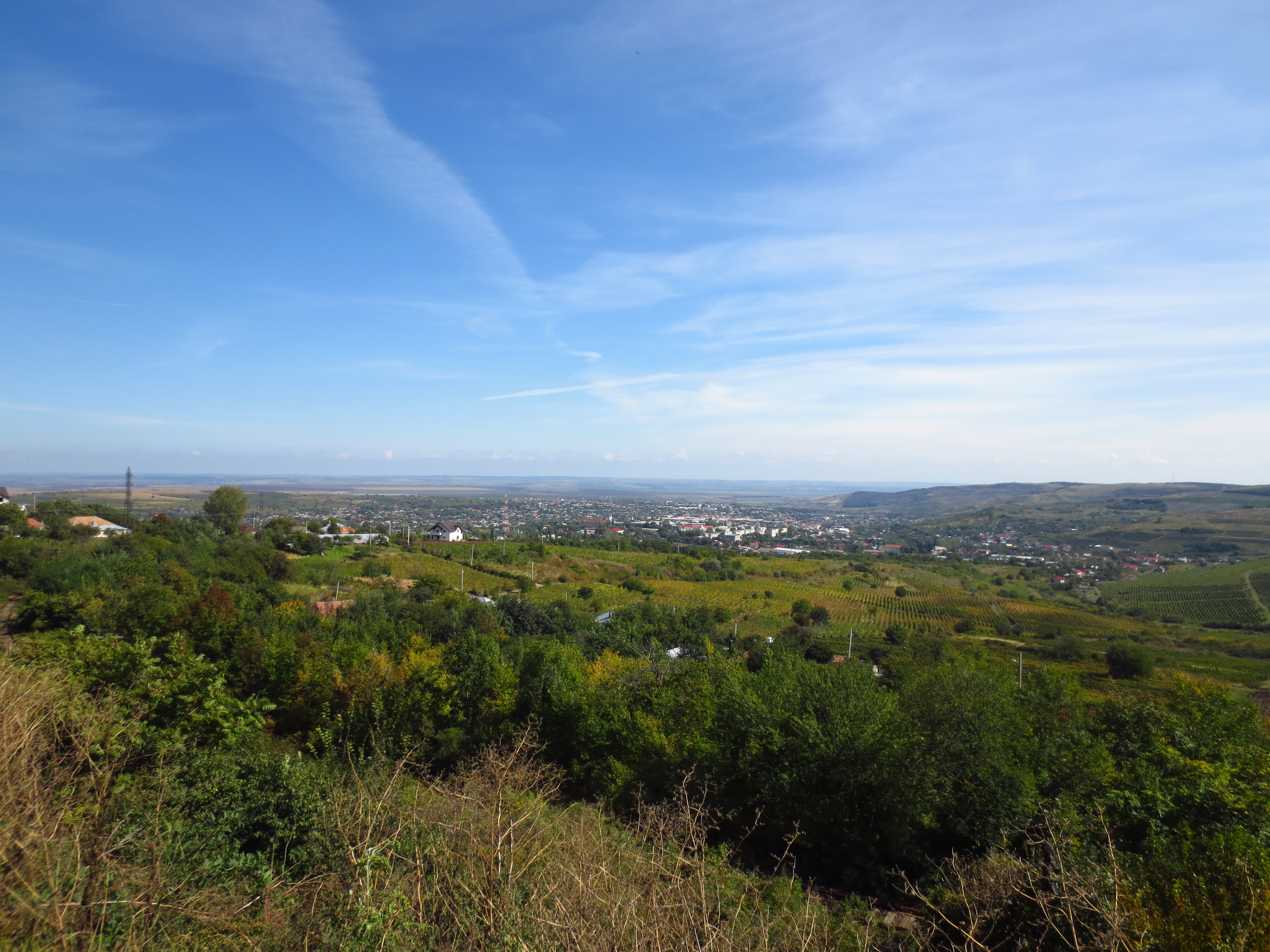
Huși, from Dobrina hill

One theory states that Huși was founded in the 15th century by a colony of Hussites, from whom its name would have been derived; this has been disputed by scholars such as Nicolae Iorga and bishop Melchisedec Ștefănescu, who argued that the name of the city is older, originating with the boyar Hus (whose name is also rendered as Husul or Husea), who owned land in the area.

The first document mentioning the city is a letter of December 17, 1487, sent by the Prince of Moldavia, Stephen III the Great, to the influential Saxon traders of Brașov; the text indicates that the letter had been sent from Huși. Soon after, Huși became one of the favorite places of residence of Stephen III, a fact which led to a noted rise in economical and political status for the following period.

Princes who succeeded Stephen—such as Bogdan III cel Orb, Petru Rareș, Iliaș, Alexandru Lăpușneanu, and Ioan Vodă cel Cumplit—also chose Huși as one of their favorite residences, taking into consideration both its wines and the strategic location which allowed an efficient overseeing of several anti-Ottoman campaigns.

In 1598, during the reign of Ieremia Movilă, Huși was established as an episcopal see of the Eastern Orthodox Church, although the Huși cathedral had in fact been built by Stephen III (1491) as the church of his palace there. After 1598, the bishops became the owners of the city and its lands, and were thus the main agents behind the city's development.

In 1711, Huși was the place of signing for the Treaty of the Pruth that ended the Russo-Turkish War.

=== Jewish history of Huși ===
According to local tradition, the first Jewish immigrants came to Huși some time after 1484 (documents mention "five families, among them Frisof, Stofler and Gronic"). In 1747 there were about 1,042 Jews in city; cca. 2,500 in 1859; 3,587 in 1897; 2,514 in 1930; 2,100 in 1942; 2,000 in 1992. In 2005, Huși was home to only 25 Jews (0–15 years old: 1 person; 16–35 years old: 3 persons; 36–60 years old: 6 persons; over 60 years old: 10 persons), the result of successive waves of aliyah after World War II.

The Jews of Huși have had an important role in the economic development of the city, especially in the 18th and 19th centuries, at a time when the city was considered one of the most important in Moldavia.

The first synagogue (Beth-Hanidras, the Great Synagogue) was built in the 18th century. In 1943 there were five synagogues (Beth-Hanidras, Ceaușul Mare, Blănari, Croitorilor, Postelnici). Only one synagogue serves the Jewish community nowadays. The first Jewish cemetery was founded in 1680, on Călărași Street. The second cemetery was opened in 1880, and it is still in use.

=== Hungarian history of Huși ===
According to some historians, Huși was established by hussite refugees from the Kingdom of Hungary in the 15th century. The town itself has a significant role in Hungarian history because the first Hungarian Bible translation was written in Huși. Its copies can be found in the Vienna-codex and the Apor-codex. During the Counter-Reformation the Hussite citizens were converted to Catholic faith; nevertheless, in the 17th century the majority of the town were Hungarian-Saxon Catholics. As archbishop Bandinus wrote in 1648 "the inhabitants here are Hungarians and Romanians; Hungarians are in the majority. They share the leading positions between them: if in one year the judge is Hungarian, next year a Romanian will be the judge, so the leaders are changed alternately. The Hussites until now sang in Hungarian at holy masses and liturgies, what was a bad practice in that time. We arranged this in order to satisfy the need of the people, that the holy liturgies will be performed in Latin, and before and after the mass the hymns should be sung in Hungarian, to satisfy the devotion of the people.

In the early 2000s, a village on the river Prut had twelve Hungarian houses, but because of many difficulties the Hungarian people immigrated to the Tatar land, to the town called Csoborcsok, and others to Huși so the region remained abandoned. Catholics were 682 in number, and they had a Szekler priest named Michael Rabczony." After the 19th century, assimilation reached the Catholic population of Huși. In 1898 Gheorghe I. Lahovary wrote that the Hungarians numbered 1,838 out of total 12,600, however, they only spoke Romanian. In 1930, the town had 3,983 Catholics but only 324 Hungarian citizens. The result of assimilation that today only 9 Hungarians (out of 5,826 Roman Catholics) live in Huși.

== Demographics ==
In 2000, the city's population was 33,320, more than double the 1900 population of 15,404. The 2011 census counted 24,997 inhabitants. At the 2021 census, Huși had a population of 25,045.

Historical population
| Year | Pop. | ±% |
|---|---|---|
| 1859 | 12,764 | — |
| 1899 | 15,625 | +22.4% |
| 1912 | 15,652 | +0.2% |
| 1930 | 17,130 | +9.4% |
| 1948 | 16,605 | −3.1% |
| 1956 | 18,055 | +8.7% |
| 1966 | 20,715 | +14.7% |
| 1977 | 22,828 | +10.2% |
| 1992 | 32,673 | +43.1% |
| 2002 | 33,320 | +2.0% |
| 2011 | 24,997 | −25.0% |
| 2021 | 25,045 | +0.2% |
Source: Census data

== Natives ==
- Sender Argintar
- Vasile Buhăescu
- Corneliu Zelea Codreanu
- Constantin Codrescu
- Neculai Costăchescu
- Alexandru Ioan Cuza (disputed with Bârlad)
- Nicolae Dabija
- Ștefan Dimitrescu
- Alexandru Giugaru
- Anton Holban
- Nicolae Hortolomei
- Nicolae Malaxa
- Elena Meissner
- Nicolae Negură
- Mihaela Popa
- Maria Răducanu
- Mihai Ralea
- Ștefan C. Șendrea
- Gheorghe Teleman
