= Isaac Pereire =

French entrepreneur and politician (1806–1880)

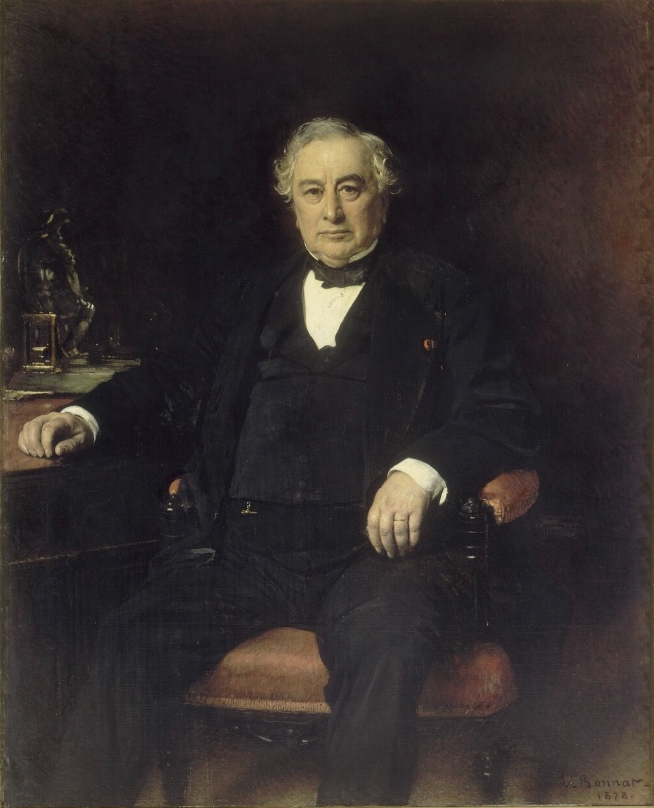
- Portrait by Léon Bonnat

Member of the Corps législatif
- In office 20 December 1863 – ?
- Constituency: Pyrénées-Orientales

Personal details
- Born: 25 November 1806 Bordeaux, French Empire
- Died: 12 July 1880 (aged 73) Gretz-Armainvilliers, France
- Resting place: Montmartre Cemetery, Paris
- Spouses: Rachel da Fonseca (m. 1831–1837); Fanny Pereire (m. 1841)
- Children: Eugène Pereire; Georges Pereire; Gustave Pereire; Henriette Pereire; Jeanne Sophie Rodrigues Pereire; Édouard Pereire
- Relatives: Émile Pereire (brother)
- Occupation: Politician; businessman; banker
- Known for: Chemins de fer de Lyon, Ottoman Bank, railway finance innovations

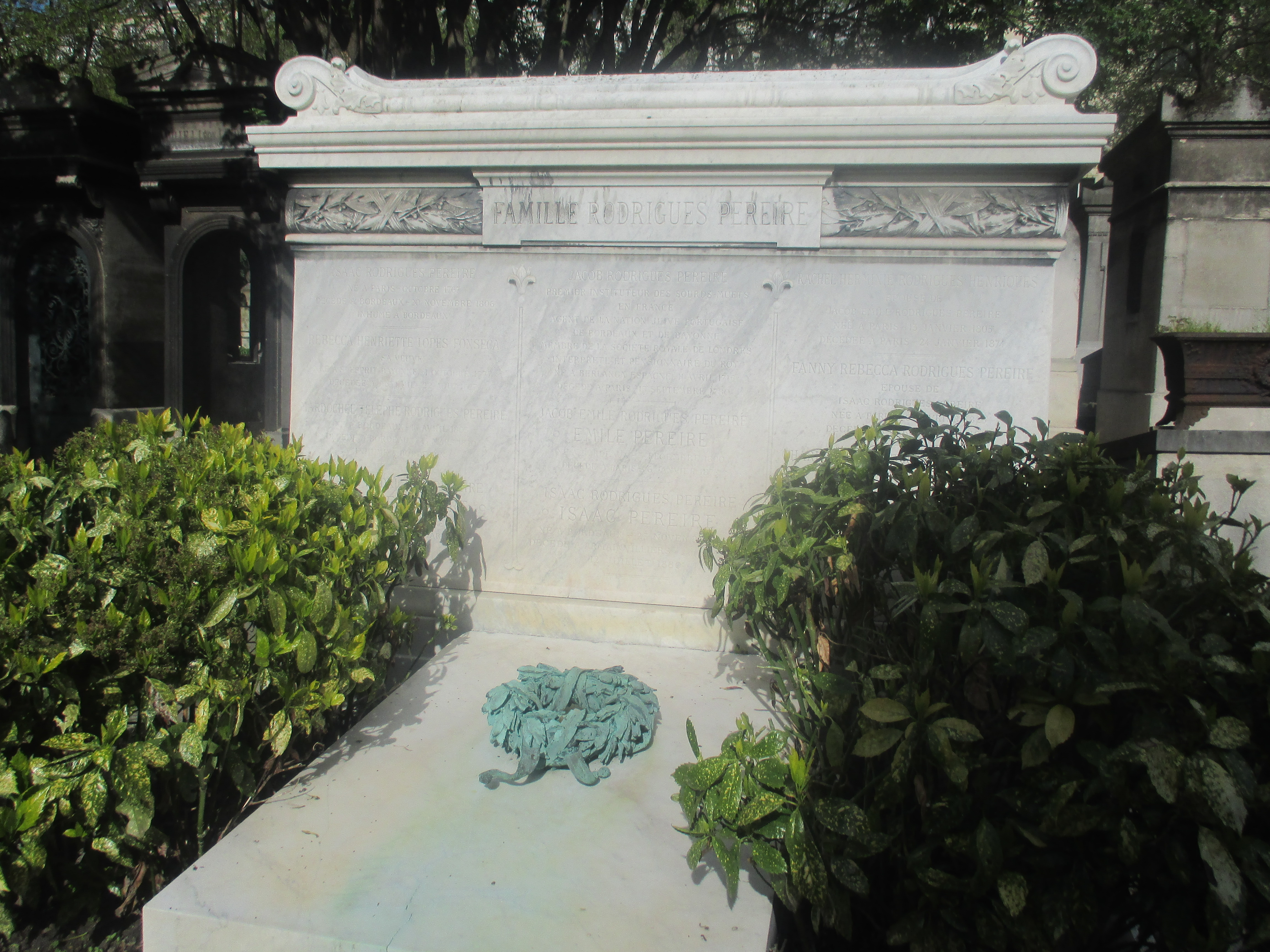
The tomb of Pereire

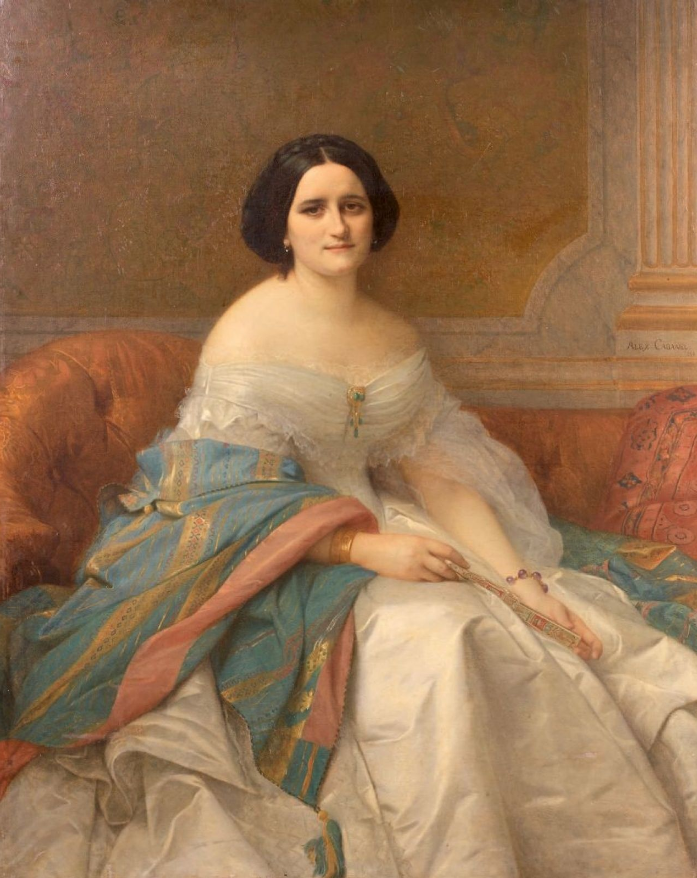
Portrait of his second wife.

Isaac Pereire (25 November 1806 – 12 July 1880) was a French politician and businessman.

== Early life ==
He was born in Bourdeaux to broker and maritime insurer Isaac Rodrigues Pereire (son of Jacob Rodrigues Pereira) and his wife Rebecca Lopès-Fonseca, making him the grandson of the scholar, linguist and speech pathologist Jacob Rodrigue Pereire, nephew of Isaac Rodrigues-Henriques and younger brother of Émile Pereire, who proved closely involved in his fortune and all his financial dealings. Isaac senior welcomed Isaac junior to Paris, where the latter based himself.

== Career ==
He was one of the first administrators of the Chemins de fer de Lyon and created the 3 0/0 type of railway bonds, later adopted by all major French railway companies. He was a member of the Paris committee of the Ottoman Bank from 1863 to 1868. Conseiller général for Perpignan, he was elected deputy to the Corps législatif on 1 June 1863 by the single constituency of Pyrénées-Orientales. That election was invalidated and he was re-elected the following 20 December, sitting in the dynastic majority.

He wrote notable articles on economic questions for the newspaper La Liberté, in which he had bought a large number of shares in 1875 and which later belonged to his son Gustave. He also set up a 100,000 franc prix for the best paper on poverty and - in memory of Jacob Rodrigue Pereire - found an école for deaf-mutes in Paris in 1875. He died at the château d'Armainvilliers in Gretz-Armainvilliers in 1880 and is buried in division 3 of the cimetière de Montmartre.

== Personal life ==
His first marriage was to Rachel da Fonseca (1812-1837), with whom he had :

- Eugène Pereire (1831-1908), financier, businessman, deputy for Tarn
- Georges Pereire (1836-1854)

After Rachel's death, he remarried in 1841 to his niece Fanny Pereire, daughter of his brother Émile and his wife Rachel Rodrigues-Henriques. They had :

- Gustave Pereire (1846-1925), press baron, financier, art patron and father of the writer Alfred Pereire (1879-1957)
- Henriette Pereire (born 1853), wife of Eugène Mir
- Jeanne Sophie Rodrigues Pereire (born 1856), wife of Eduardo Philipson and mother of Dino Philipson
- Édouard Pereire (1855-1876)

== Works ==
- Leçons sur l’industrie et les finances prononcées à la salle de l’Athénée, suivies d’un projet de banque (1832) (BNF Base Gallica)
- Rôle de la Banque de France et organisation du crédit en France (1864)
- Budget de 1877 (1877)
- Question financière (1877)
- La réforme de l'impôt (1877)
- La Question des chemins de fer (1879) (BNF Base Gallica)
- La Question religieuse (1879)
- Politique financière (1879)

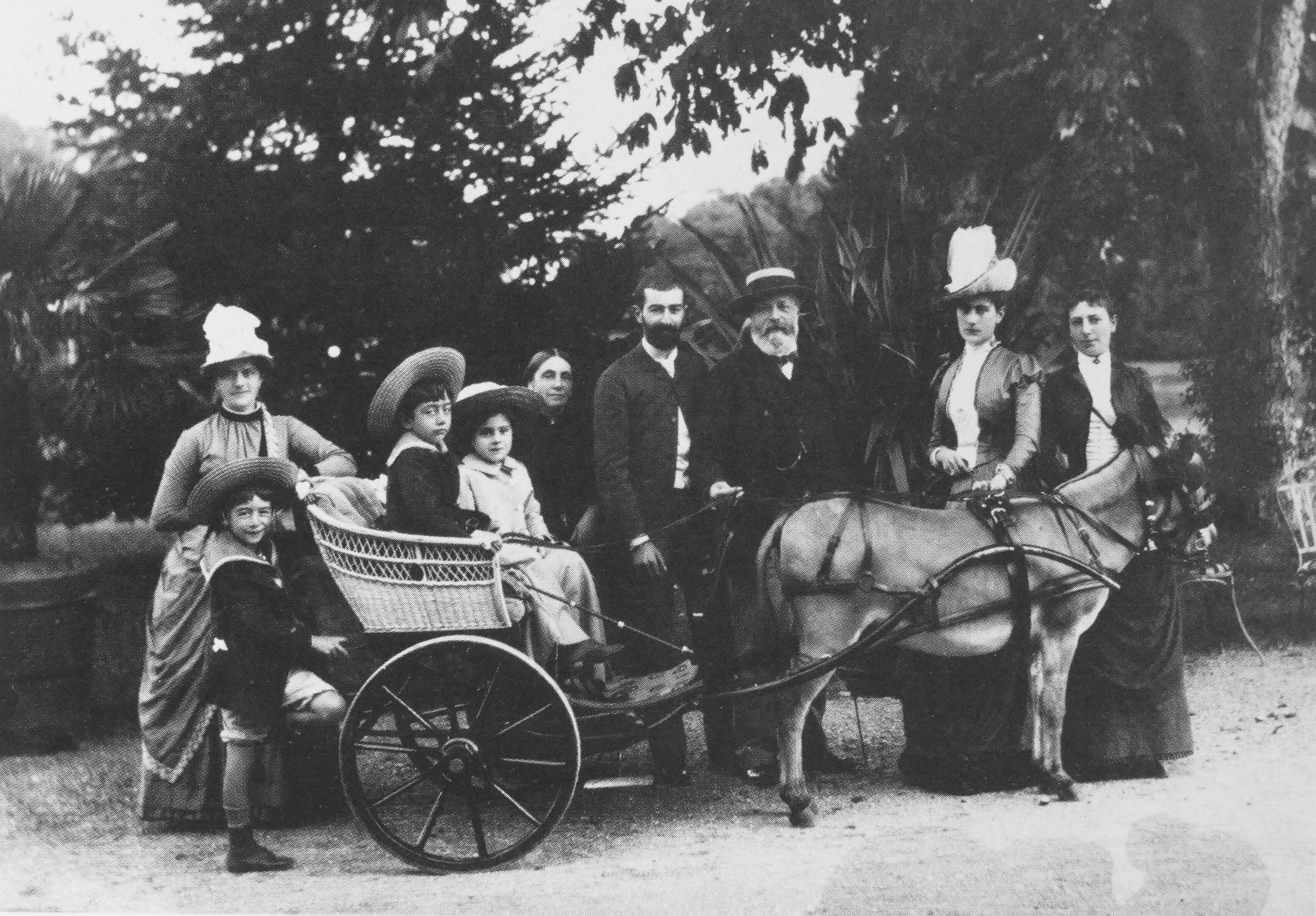
The Pereire family around 1875.
