= Compagnie du chemin de fer Grand-Central de France =

French railway company, 1853 - 1857

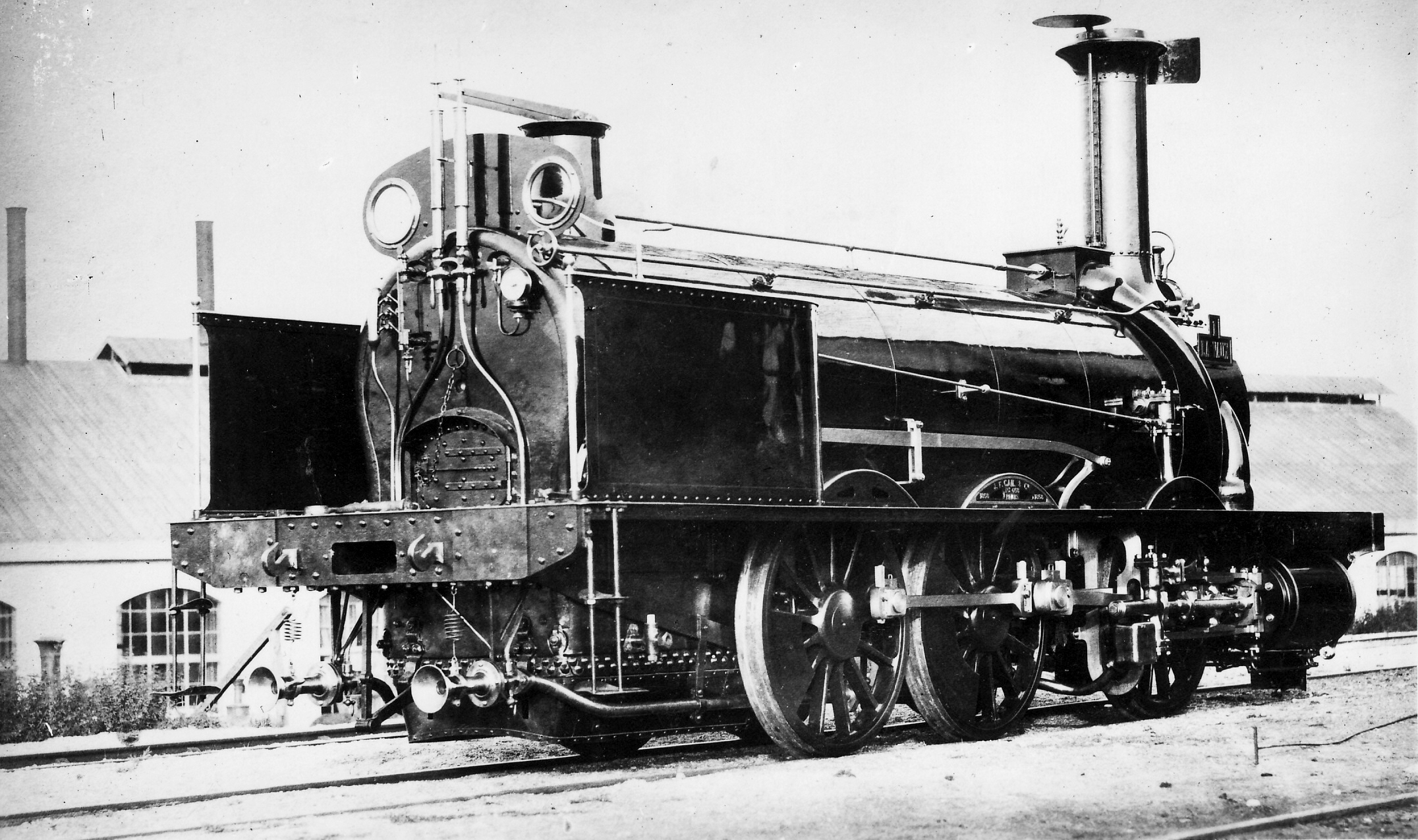
0-6-0 locomotive «Bourbonnais» of J. F. Cail & Cie, 1855-1857

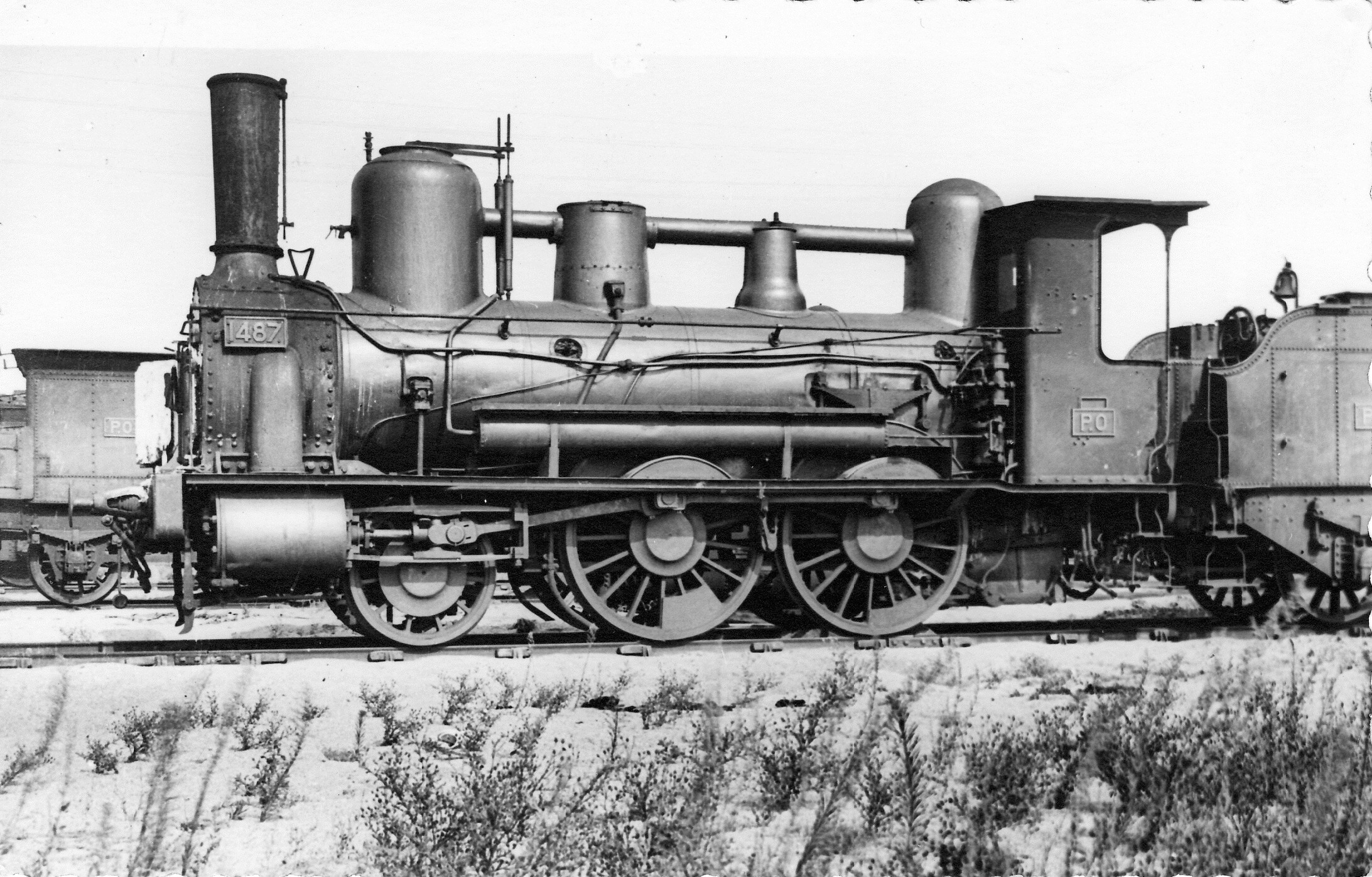
Porter locomotive type 120 of Compagnie du chemin de fer de Paris à Orléans N° 1487 (ex Grand-Central) prior to transformation

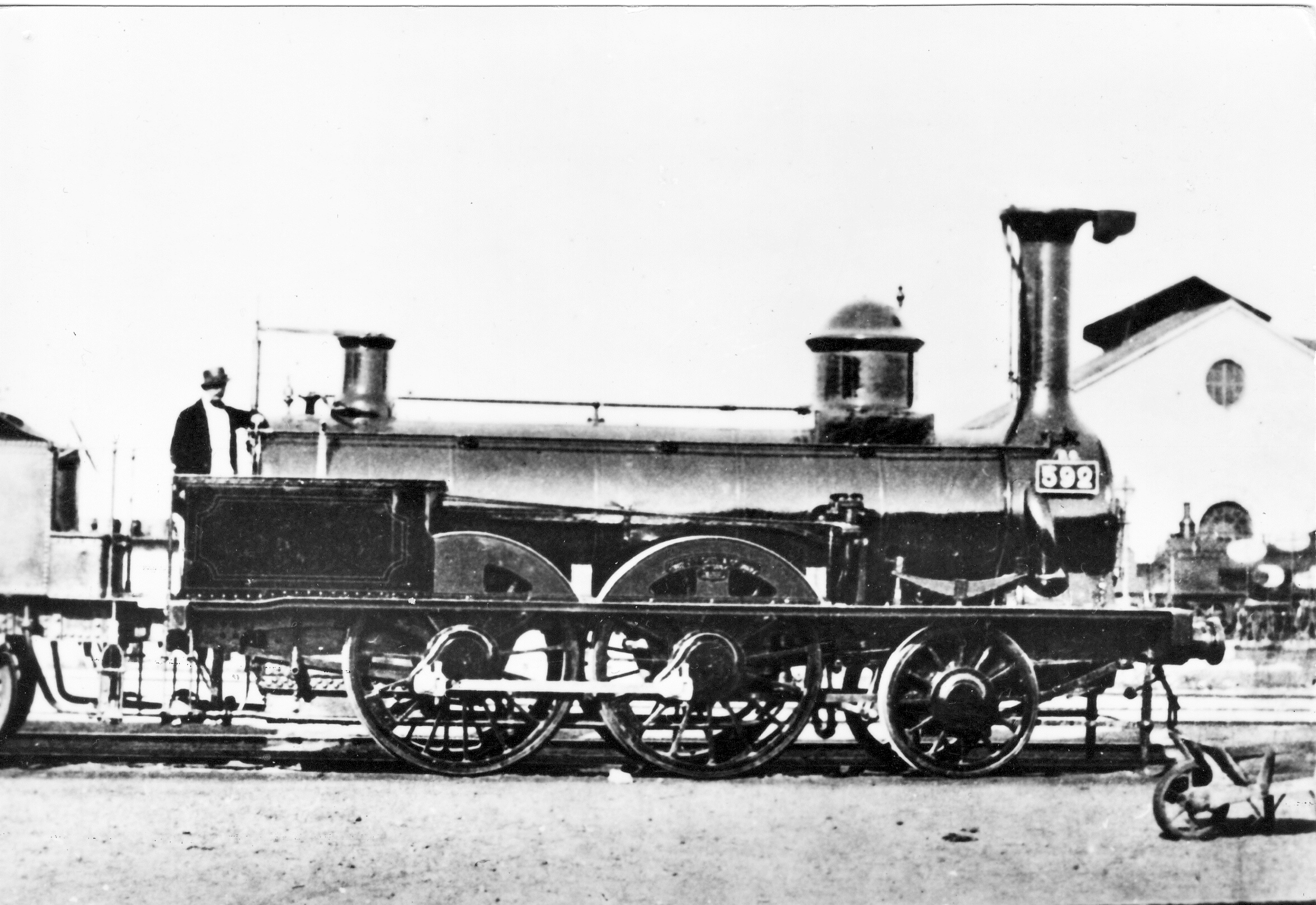
Porter type 120 of Compagnie du chemin de fer de Paris à Orléans N° 592 (ex Grand-Central)

The Compagnie du chemin de fer Grand-Central de France (French pronunciation: [kɔ̃paɲi dy ʃəmɛ̃ də fɛʁ ɡʁɑ̃ sɑ̃tʁal də fʁɑ̃s], Grand-Central Railway Company of France), commonly known as the Compagnie du Grand-Central, or more simply the Grand-Central, was a railway company which operated in France from 1853 to 1857.

Recalling the name of the English Grand Junction Railway (1833–1846) or the Grand Trunk Railway Company of Canada (1852–1919), the Grand-Central existed for a brief period in the history of French railways that was marked by a government keen to instigate public works, notably the extension of the railway network. The new Second Empire regime decided to give railway companies a long-term monopoly over a specific geographical region in return for a greater involvement of the State in constructing a network of branch lines within these territories.

The Grand-Central was disadvantaged by having an isolated network in a rugged geographical area which had limited economic opportunities. It lacked a terminus in Paris or a main line to the capital that benefited from the feeds of branch lines of the type that existing companies had already built. It soon suffered from the manoeuvres of key players (specifically government, competing companies, and bankers), and from the financial crisis that began in 1856.

The Grand-Central story is also a consequence of the business climate of the era and the tussle between the Pereire brothers, with their innovative financial methods executed through the Crédit Mobilier bank, and James de Rothschild and the powerful Banque de France....

These handicaps led to its rapid failure and dismemberment.

== Background ==
The birth of the Second Empire led to the resumption of business confidence and a revived interest in railway securities. Several figures in the new regime had interests in Central France, including the Dordogne deputy Pierre Magne, who was Minister of Public Works and subsequently Minister of Finance and was keen on a line from Limoges to Agen, and Charles de Morny, a deputy from Puy-de-Dôme and president of the Corps Législatif, who owned a sugar factory near Clermont-Ferrand.

Napoleon III decided that economic expansion could be stimulated by encouraging the private sector to invest in major projects, and in particular the extension of the railway network. The Ponts & Chaussées administration was now allowed to grant 99-year concessions and underwrite the bond coupons of the companies behind these projects.

The new regime promoted a scheme of networks centred on a geographical region and served by a main line from which branch lines would extend. This doctrine was set out by de Morny in 1852 during the debate on an act relating to the Lyon-Méditerranée railway. The regime would award railway concessions competitively, and would also use legislation to impose its will. (Note: For example, the Compagnie du chemin de fer de Lyon à la Méditerranée was prohibited, when it was constituted in July 1852, from any treaty of merger or alliance with the Compagnie du chemin de fer de Paris à Orléans and its associates.) This would ensure that regions that were not immediately attractive to major investment could be serviced, whilst exercising a degree of control of the companies.

The railways were expected to become more efficient through the operation of coherent routes that avoided transshipment costs and delays between networks; overheads would be reduced and traffic fluctuations could be absorbed. Moreover, thanks to the "network" effect, companies could reduce tariffs to stimulate new traffic. Finally, sustainable long-term revenues would attract investor confidence and assist companies to raise capital.

The rational development of a network within an exclusive region was seen as beneficial to the development of the economy of the region and to the nation as a whole.

This policy was in contrast to that carried out under the July Monarchy, which "feared that the existence of too powerful companies would be a danger to the state and to public power. Hence its preference for fragmented lines and to weaken their grip."

=== The ambitions of the Paris-Orléans Railway ===
==== Context ====
From the inception of the July Monarchy, a north-south link lay at the heart of all of schemes promoted by railway interests (the state, companies and bankers). "A revolution in the speed, regularity and capacity of transport is imminent. It is running late and has made its mark abroad before it has in France, leading to an attempt to divert the Mediterranean-North Sea traffic to Trieste and Genoa at the expense of Marseille. It is therefore imperative to build a major Le Havre-Paris-Lyon-Marseille link as quickly as possible."

The line between Paris and Lyon could either take the Bourbonnais route (the long-established road via the Loire via Montargis, Nevers and Roanne) or the route via Burgundy (sharing the main line to the east, as preferred by the Ponts & Chaussées department). (Note: See CF de Montereau à Troyes.) A railways act of 11 June 1842 described such a route through the centre of France without specifying its course.

In October 1844, the Compagnie du chemin de fer du Centre was granted routes between Orléans and Vierzon and then on to Bec d'Allier, at the confluence of the Allier and the Loire, near Nevers, via Bourges, as well as a Vierzon-Châteauroux branch. In reality, the CF du Centre was a cover for the Paris-Orléans railway, and a number of the directors were common to both companies. (Note: It was one of the perverse effects of the July Monarchy Ponts & Chaussées policy: an established operator was rejected in the award of a new concession.)

The Paris-Orléans was supported by industrial and mining interests from the centre of France, including the Compagnie des mines de la Loire à Saint-Étienne, six out of 21 of whose directors were from the Paris-Orléans (De Rainneville, Benoist d’Azy, Bartholony, de Bousquet, de Mouchy, and Delahante who took over its management from 1853). (Note: The importance of the Paris-Orléans in the mining company diminished from 1848 until its withdrawal.) Other supporters were the Compagnie des Houillères and Fonderies de l'Aveyron in Decazeville (from 1853 onwards), and which was backed by a group of major Protestant finance houses in Paris at the instigation of the Paris-Orléans, (Note: For Decazeville: A Cottier, Humann, Andre fils, a Catholic but with close business links to the Geneva banks, whist for the CFPO: F Cottier, E André, Hagerman, Colin, Mathieu, de Waru, L Dufour, G. Odier, Bartholony, James Odier, Pillet-Will.) and the Compagnie des forges et fonderies de Montluçon, founded by Benoist d’Azy. (Note: Benoist d'Azy joined the CF CA from the Paris-Orléans in 1840, the Orléans-Bordeaux in 1844, that Tours-Nantes in 1845 and was vice-president of the Paris-Orléans in 1852 after the merger. He was a deputy for Château-Chinon in 1841, 1842 and 1846.) Benoist d'Azy was also associated with Drouillard, with whom he took over the Société des Fonderies et Forges d'Alès in 1836. In 1837, he took part in the establishing of a new company, Émile Martin et Cie, in Fourchambault.

==== Culmination ====
At the beginning of August 1849, the Paris-Orléans and the CF du Centre joined forces with the Saint-Étienne-Lyon to fight a Paris-Avignon line proposal by the Pereire brothers, which would take over construction of the Paris-Lyon line being undertaken by the state. (Note: Sequestrated by the Second Republic, work on the Paris-Lyon line had been continued by the state.) The Pereires' project was fought by Bartholony and the engineer Paulin Talabot, who were afraid of being locked out of the North-South link.

At the end of August, the CF du Centre, wishing to stop its rivals in Lyon and to extend its own line as far as Givors via the Chemins de fer de Roanne à Saint-Étienne (Note: fr:Compagnie du chemin de fer de Saint-Étienne à la Loire and the fr:Compagnie du chemin de fer la Loire.) and from Saint-Etienne to Lyon, requested that the Bec d'Allier-Roanne line be financed by a loan guaranteed by the state. This request was ignored as the administration wanted to direct the CF du Centre towards Clermont and Limoges, but Bartholony preferred the route towards Roanne and the Mediterranean (Marseille).

In April 1850, parliament agreed in principle to grant two concessions between Paris and the Mediterranean (Paris-Lyon and Lyon-Avignon); "the line was broken". Consequently, rather than seeking to participate in a joint venture for the whole route, Bartholony limited his ambitions to Paris-Lyon and sought an understanding with Paulin Talabot, who had interests in the Lyon-Avignon line. However, Bartholony did not give up the development of the CF du Centre's network. In 1850, the company sought to benefit from the new concession provided by the 1842 act; first from Bec d'Allier to Roanne, and then towards Clermont, as well as further west from Châteauroux to Argenton-sur-Creuse starting from the line to Limoges. The prospect of a Paris-Lyon line via the Bourbonnais (Paris-Nevers-Roanne-Saint-Étienne) was receding. Eventually, the Paris-Orléans merged with the CF du Centre (which shared the same management team), the Tours-Nantes (which feared competition from the Compagnie de l'Ouest), and the Orleans-Bordeaux (which feared that it would become isolated by competition from the Limoges line). In March 1852 the administration approved these mergers in exchange for the construction of lines to Roanne, Clermont, Limoges and La Rochelle.

Thus, in just a few years, the Paris-Orléans had achieved effective control of central France services, with a prospect of serving the Massif Central via Clermont-Ferrand and Limoges. But in return, they had had to renounce any prospective mergers with the Compagnie du chemin de fer de Lyon à Avignon and the Compagnie du chemin de fer de Marseille à Avignon. Moreover, its expansion towards the south had been blocked by the creation of the Compagnie du Midi, which was in the hands of the Pereire brothers.

== The Grand-Central project ==
=== Context ===
The government wished to establish a concession to serve the central France and the Midi Pyrenees whilst freeing itself from the influence of the CF Lyon-Méditerranée, which was dominated by the highly enterprising Paulin Talabot, and the increasingly powerful Paris-Orléans, headed by François Bartholoni.

The companies, however, were slow to carry out the proposed work, which needed substantial capital. They were reluctant to invest in the construction of lines into sparsely populated, difficult to access mountainous terrain. Up to this point, railways had generally followed wide river valleys, or passed from one valley to the other via gentle inclines. A network through the Massif Central required bolder technical solutions.

The government encouraged the creation of new companies whose competition would alarm their wealthy rivals and cause the latter to come to terms with the policy of the State. (Note: In addition to the Grand-Central, others emerged, including the CF de Lyon à Geneva (April 1852), the St Rambert-Grenoble (May 1853), and the C^{ie} des Ardennes (July 1853).) At the same time, in order to raise the necessary capital, the government supported the creation of a new type of financial institution, Crédit Mobilier, (Note: Here we find again Gustave Delahante, financiers associated with the Protestant banks in Paris (Benoît Fould, Mallet, Hottinguer, André) and others who usually worked with the house of Rothschild (for example, Raffaele de Ferrari).) which was set up by the Pereire brothers with Benoît Fould, Victor de Persigny and Morny, amongst others. This financial enterprise was to serve the new regime's plans for the development of the nation's infrastructure (railways, transatlantic ships, docks, the funding of urban renewal in Paris and the provinces, etc.).

A group of Parisian major banks opposed Crédit Mobilier, fearing the emergence of a financial monopoly that would eclipse them. They created a banking syndicate under the leadership of James de Rothschild, the Réunion Financièr. (Note: These included Henri Davillier, Vernes, Paulin Talabot, François Bartholoni, a number of the Parisian Protestant banks (Paccard-Dufour, Edouard Hentsch), Dassier, Marcuard successor to André & Cottier), Edward Charles Blount, and Joseph-Mayer Cahen of Antwerp.)

=== Realisation ===
Up to this point, Morny had supported Bartholony in his hopes of extending the Clermont-Ferrand line into the Massive Central. (Note: Morny had been Vice-President of the Paris-Orléans since the merger of 1852, and as has been noted was vice-president of the Paris-Orléans supervisory board.) (Note: In the 1846 parliamentary debate on the Centre railway, Morny supported an amendment proposed by Dupin (the elder), Manuel and Benoist d'Azy, all deputies from Nièvre, the last of whom had been closely associated with the Paris-Orléans as a manager of the various companies before the merger, for the extension of the railway towards Clermont through the Loire valley (before reaching Roanne) and Abron, rather than the Allier valley route supported by the government.) Similarly, in the light of the threat from a Crédit Mobilier railway monopoly, he supported Bartholony's plan at the end of 1852 to merge the Paris-Orléons, Lyon-Méditerranée and Paris-Lyon lines into a Compagnie des chemins de fer du Sud which would serve the Massif Central. It would have been one of four great networks (Ouest, Nord, Est and Sud) into which France would be partitioned. The Midi would be free to join with the Sud, or to remain independent. But on 1 January 1853, Le Moniteur Universel opposed the government's proposal.

In addition, deputies from the Massif Central mining areas argued for branch lines to transport their products, particularly from the Aveyron mines which had difficulty shipping their output via the river Lot to Bordeaux. The businessmen asserted that mineral deposits comparable to those found in England could also be found in the Massif Central, but that transport doubled its cost. (Note: From 1847 to 1852, the coal cost consumers ₣2 per metric quintal (100kg), whereas it was priced at the point of extraction at only ₣0.933.)

With this in mind, representatives from the Aubin mines in the Aveyron coal fields (notably de Pourtalès and Seraincourt) tried to attract investors in England, where the plethora of British railway schemes no longer offered attractive premiums, to invest in a line linking Clermont-Ferrand to Toulouse via Montauban to serve the Massif Central fields. They asked the Duke of Morny to chair the company that would construct the line. (Note: The Grand-Central scheme originated with the steps taken by the Aubin mine and forge owners to find better distribution for their products, which were difficult to transport via the Lot. These steps, furthermore, were not without ulterior speculative motives. The history of these approaches and speculation is presented in the dispute, in June 1853, between the owners of Aubin and François Gracchus Cabrol, director of Decazeville, about the advertisements they placed to raise the necessary funds to form a "Compagnie des houillères et forges d’Aubin". In 1845, de Seraincourt acquired several mines around Aubin for ₣0.6m. Subsequently, in May 1846, he decided to create a "Société des mines d'Aubin" with a capital of ₣6m, including ₣1.4m for his own contribution (worth only ₣0.6m the previous year). The company's founders included Alexandre Aguado, Pellaprat, de Galliera. Despite having started construction, the company was dissolved in 1851 put up for auction with a reserve price of ₣6m. In the absence of any takers at this price, a sale took place for only ₣0.5m in November. The Aubin forges were bought by Pourtales for ₣1.75m, and in 1852 become the core assets in a scheme to create a company listed in both Paris and London entitles Compagnie des Houillères et Forges d'Aubin with a capital of ₣4m (₣3.2m in capital plus ₣0.8m in working capital, against an earlier redemption value of ₣1.75m). The anglo-french board of directors comprised Pourtalès, Seraincourt, James Ashwel, Cail, Margueritte, G. Wythes, G. Masterman and Morny (Chairman). Even before this public limited company was authorized by the government, an advertisement appeared in the Times extolling the riches of the minefields, the great prospects for development and attractive returns, and a railway from Aubin to Montauban which would double the output. The plans for the railway from Clermont to Montauban via Aubin were entrusted by Pourtalès and Seraincourt to the engineers Peters and Barrande. Their report submitted at the beginning of June 1852 earned them ₣12,000. When the Grand-Central was formed in 1853, these studies were sold to the new company by Pourtalès and Seraincourt for ₣15,000. They also received other benefits; "MM de Pourtalès et C^{ie} have the right to subscribe at par for six thousand shares in the new company which will be reserved for them in equal part by the two parties, English and French." "...de Seraincourt stipulated that Aubin would supply those rails and castings in which interested for all the projected lines." " ... the right to subscribe to 12,000 Grand-Central shares at par (₣500), of which 6,000 are specially applicable to the contribution and transfer of the Clermont track." "... they sold these shares at a premium of ₣70 to ₣80 ..." They also each received ₣15,000 as managers of the company.) Morny incorporated the line from Limoges to Agen, which had been promoted without success by Magne (Minister of Public Works and a deputy from Dordogne) to Bartholony since November 1852, and the direct line from Bordeaux to Lyon via the south of the Massif Central, in association with Crédit Mobilier, where Morny became a member of the board of directors in 1853 after it had been set up.

Finally, on the initiative of Delahante, the Compagnie des mines de la Loire, which wanted to improve access to its output, agreed with Crédit Mobilier to merge the three small Saint-Etienne area railway companies into a single company with the aim of reconstructing these lines to give a streamlined operation with up-to-date equipment. Agreements were concluded between the three small companies to transfer their operations to a new Compagnie des chemins de fer de jonction du Rhône à la Loire, whose concession was granted by decree on 17 May 1853. (Note: These were the CF de Saint-Étienne à la Loire, the CF de la Loire and the CF de Saint-Étienne à Lyon, and the agreements were dated December 22nd and 27th, 1852 and April 6th, 1853.) The company's statutes were approved on 30 September 1853. (Note: The Duc de Mouchy, Benoît Fould, Ch. Seguin, G. Desarts (typographical error "des Arts") et G. Delahante were nominated to the board of directors.) Crédit Mobilier subscribed for 10,000 of the 60,000 share capital, and both the Pereire brothers took 1,000 shares. Paris-Orléans now had a connection to Lyon for its Moulins, Saint-Germain-des-Fossés and Roanne lines, and the Pereire brothers were in a stronger position through control of the junctions between the Paris-Lyon line, the Lyon-Méditerranée line and the Paris-Orléans. This situation was not displeasing to the government, which had feared the creation of an over-large Sud network (referred to as supra) in the hands of Bartholony (Paris-Orléans) and Talabot (Lyon-Méditerranée).

== Creation of the company ==
The Compagnie du chemin de fer Grand-Central de France was registered in July 1853. (Note: When its articles were examined by the Conseil d'Etat, the name "Grand-Central de France" was rejected; Morny argued that the share certificates had already been printed with this name, and it was eventually accepted. In letter to Dubois dated 18 January 1853, Courpon, the company secretary, stated: "The Grand-Central company was set up in London, and subsequently sought subscriptions in France." In the dispute between Pourtalès and Seraincourt and the engineers Peters and Barrande, who they had commissioned to undertake the first study of the line from Clermont to Montauban (handed over in June 1852), it is recorded that de Seraincourt founded an anglo-french company called Grand-Central in London in March 1853.) It was the result of an agreement between Magne and Morny's company for the merger of three railways:

- Clermont-Ferrand to Montauban, viewed as a continuation of the Paris-Clermont line to Aurillac, Montauban, Toulouse and Foix. It served the Brassac and Aveyron coalfields (Firmi, Decazeville, Aubin) via branch lines. This line shared a common 120 km section with the Lyon-Bordeaux line;
- Limoges-Agen, viewed as a continuation of the Paris-Limoges line to Périgueux and Agen, then ultimately the Pyrénées. It passed through Limousin and Dordogne where there were many forges and blast furnaces;
- Lyon-Bordeaux, connecting the main Atlantic port with the most important manufacturing centres of the nation and subsequently Switzerland, northern Italy and central Germany. (Note: Summary of a report to a general meeting of the Grand-Central on 15 October 1853.) It used a 110 km section of the Bordeaux-Coutras line, (Note: Bordeaux-Coutras was a section of the Angoulême-Bordeaux line opened by Paris-Orléons in September 1852.) the Saint-Étienne to Lyon segment it already shared, and 120 km of the Aurillac-Lempdes stretch of the Clermont to Montauban line.

Rights to the links from Clermont to Lempdes (59 km), from Montauban to the river Lot and eventually to Figeac (155 km), and from Coutras to Périgueux (74 km), a total of 288 km, were assigned for a 99-year period. The company undertook to build these sections within four years without subsidy or guarantee of bond coupons. These lines had not been the subject of detailed preliminary studies, which explains the lack of precision concerning their course.

The sections from Lempdes to the river Lot (156 km), Limoges to Agen (223 km) and the two gaps (Périgueux-Brive and Brive to Lot completing the Lyon-Bordeaux route (248 km) were transferred provisionally: the State would confirm these concessions within five years.

A total of 627 km of track would be completed in accordance with the provisions of the act establishing major railway lines across France at an estimated cost of F70m to the state (infrastructure) and F50 million to the company (superstructure: track and equipment).

The 30 March 1853 agreement over these permanent and provisional assignments was approved by Imperial decree on 21 April 1853.

The company's articles of association were registered on 28 July 1853 and authorised by Imperial decree.

The F90m capital (180,000 F500 shares; 80,000 placed in Britain and 100,000 placed by Crédit Mobilier, reserving 24,000 for itself) was underwritten in Paris and London successfully by both business and society Sitting on the initial board of directors (Article 31 of the company's articles of association) were Morny, as chairman, the Count of Pourtalès-Gorgier, Count Charles de Seraincourt, Gustave Delahante, Calvet-Rogniat, César de Faÿ de La Tour-Maubourg, E.C. Gibiat and, amongst the British directors, Laing (an MP), Masterman and Uzielli (bankers) and Hutchinson (chairman of the London Stock Exchange).

List of subscribers for shares (Note: Being a subscriber did not necessarily mean being the bearer of the share; shares were only allocated when fully paid up. Prior to this, subscribers had options on their shares that they could sell on. Speculators were less likely to respond promptly to calls for funds. If the business was in trouble, they might decide not to respond fully to the cash call and the company would withdraw their options. If the business was thriving, they could resell their options at a premium, preferring to buy the company's bonds which were reserved primarily for the subscribers (when fully paid up) and which, in turn, would rise once the company released its products and thus allowed resale at a profit.)
Name	No. Shares	Nationality	Notes
Matthew Uzielli	12,000	British	London banker (Crédit Mobilier associate)
James Hutchinson	12,000	British	financier, chairman of the Stock Exchange
John Mastermann	10,000	British	London banker
Harman Grisewood	10,000	British	British investor
Samuel Laing	10,000	British	Member of Parliament
Théodose Uzielli	5,000	British	financier linked to Matthew Uziellei (Crédit Mobilier associate)
Charles Devaux	11,000	French	London banker (Crédit Mobilier associate)
Alexandre Devaux	12,000	French	London banker
Charles de Morny	8,000	French	Politician (Crédit Mobilier associate)
Comte de Seraincourt	7,700	French	Charles Choppin de Seraincourt
Calvet-Rogniat	5,000	French	Pierre-Ferdinand-Hercule Calvet-Rognat (1812–1875), Député de l'Aveyron (1852–1870), président du CG (1852–1858 et 1860) de l'Aveyron, Politician
James-Alexandre de Pourtalès	5,000	Swiss	
César de Faÿ de La Tour-Maubourg	5,000	French	César de Faÿ de La Tour-Maubourg, Politician
Gustave Delahante	3,000	French	Paris banker (Crédit Mobilier associate)
Vicomte de Rainneville	2,000	French	Alphonse Vaysse de Rainneville; Politician
Albert Lacroix	2,000	French	
De Lapeyrière	2,000	French	
Crédit Mobilier	24,000	French	Bank
J.-J. Uribarren	800	French	Jose Javier de Uribarren, Paris banker (Crédit Mobilier associate)
Biesta	800	French	Hyppolite-Guillaume Biesta, Director of theComptoir National d'Escompte de Paris, financier (Crédit mobilier associate)
E. André	1,227	French	Paris banker (Crédit Mobilier associate)
Lecointe-des-Arts	1,000	French	[exact spelling: Lecointe-Desarts] Paris banker (Crédit Mobilier associate)
Adolphe d'Eichthal	800	French	Paris banker (Crédit Mobilier associate)
Beer Léon Fould et Fould-Oppenheim	4,500	French	Paris banker (Crédit Mobilier associate)
Raffaele de Ferrari	800	French	Paris businessman (Crédit Mobilier associate)
Jean-Pierre Pescatore	1,000	French	Paris banker (Crédit Mobilier associate)
Banque Mallet	1,000	French	Paris banker (Crédit Mobilier associate)
Charles Philippe Henri de Noailles	560	French	Charles Philippe Henri de Noailles, Fourth Duc de Moucy, Politician (Crédit Mobilier associate)
FEmile et Isaac Pereire	1,600	French	Paris businessmen (Crédit Mobilier associate)
Baron Seillière	800	French	Paris banker
Donon, Aubry et C^{ie}	7,000	French	Paris banker (banquier du duc de Morny)
Place et C^{ie}	5,000	French	Henri Place, Paris banker
Jules Mirès	2,000	franFrenchçaise	Businessman (Crédit Mobilier associate)
Comte de Bourmont	1,000	French	
St^{é} des mines de Brassac	1,000	French	
Adrien Delahante	2,000	French	Paris banker (Crédit Mobilier associate)
Napoléon Daru	500	French	(Inactive politician under the Second Empire) (Crédit Mobilier associate)
Comte Delamarre	500	French	Théodore-Casimir Delamarre, Paris banker (Crédit Mobilier associate)
Comte de Montguyon	500	French	(Crédit Mobilier associate)
Manuel	300	French	
Salvador	300	French	
Gibiat	300	French	
Courpon	300	French	(Company Secretary)
Leroy de Chabrol	200	French	
Guynemer	200	French	
de saint-Paul	200	French	
Jubé de la Perelle	113	French	

Distribution of Shareholders of the Société anonyme Cie du CDF Grand-Central de France
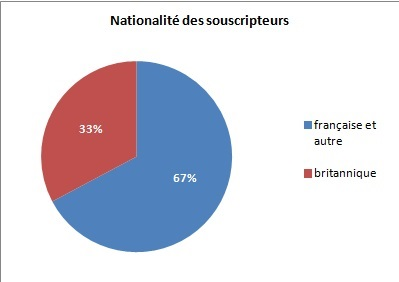
By nationality.

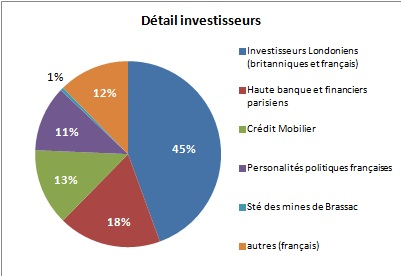
By quality.

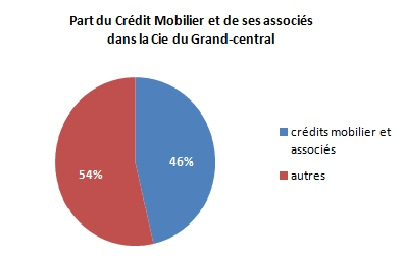
Crédit Mobilier and its associates.

Shortly afterwards, on 26 December 1853, under the aegis of Crédit Mobilier, the Grand-Central bought the CF du Rhone-Loire (150 km); to "give impetus" to the Grand-Central. (Note: "The 'very powerful influence' that the company had at its disposal was not unnecessary to overcome the reluctance of the Council of State to approve this merger with the Rhone and Loire, which the Grand Central was counting on to 'give impetus' to its name.". This acquisition required the issue of additional bonds of F30m (allocated to the rectification, improvement and operation of the acquired railways) and modification of the articles of association of the Grand-Central)
