= Pereire brothers =

French bankers and finance officials

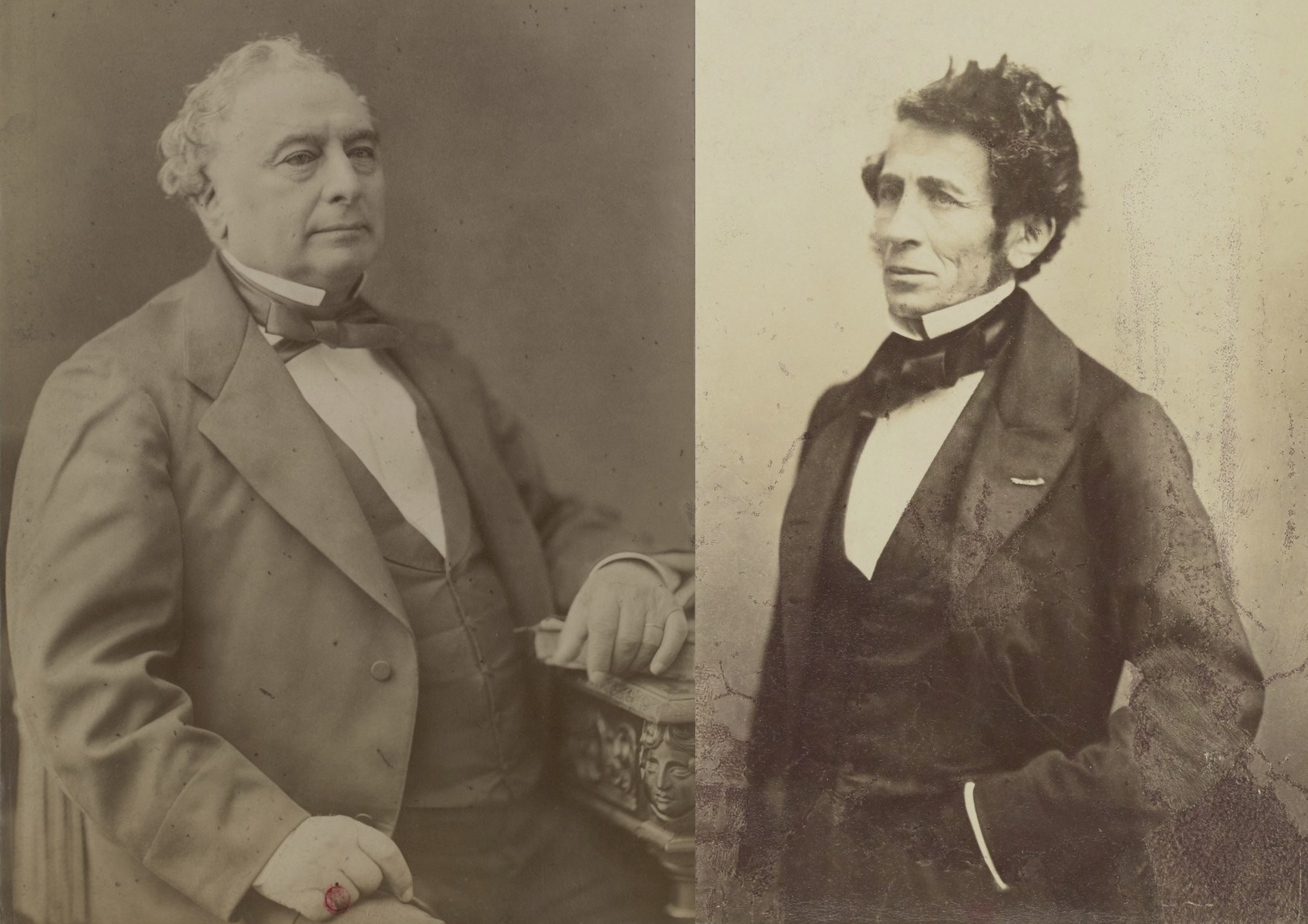
Isaac and Émile Pereire

Émile Pereire (3 December 1800, Bordeaux – 5 January 1875, Paris) and his brother Isaac Pereire (25 November 1806, Bordeaux – 12 July 1880, Gretz-Armainvilliers) were major figures in the development of France's finance and infrastructure during the Second French Empire. In the mid-nineteenth century the Pereire brothers challenged the dominance of the Rothschilds in continental European finance, known at the time as haute finance. Their attempt was temporarily successful, and even though it collapsed in the late 1860s, it contributed to a more developed and vibrant economic landscape. Like the Rothschilds, the Pereires were Jews, but unlike them, they were Sephardi of Portuguese origin.

== Family ==
The brothers' grandfather was Jacob Rodrigues Pereira, an educator credited for being an early developer of sign language for the deaf, who was born in Spain and established himself in France in 1741, where he became an interpreter for King Louis XV. Jacob Rodrigues Pereire (as he went by in French) married Miriam Lopès Dias, a Sephardic Jew from Bayonne, in Bordeaux in 1766. Their son Isaac (1770–1806) was conscripted during the French Revolutionary Wars and in 1800 married Rebecca Henriette Lopès Fonseca (1777–1827), daughter of Mardochée Lopès Fonseca and Esther de Daniel Delvaille, both also Sephardic Jews from Bayonne who had moved to Bordeaux in 1788. They had three sons, of whom the second, Mardochée Télèphe (1803–1820) died in young age.

In 1824 Émile Pereire married his cousin Herminie Rodrigues, whose mother was Henriette's sister. They had five surviving children: Fanny (born 1825), Cécile (born 1829), Claire (born 1834), Isaac-Emile (known as Emile II, born 1840) and Henry (born 1841).

In 1830 Isaac Pereire married Rachel Laurence Lopès Fonseca, a cousin of both him and Herminie; they had two sons, Eugène (born 1831) and Georges (born 1836). After Laurence's untimely death in 1837 he remarried with his niece Fanny in August 1841. Their three surviving children were Gustave (born 1846), Henriette (born 1853) and Jeanne (born 1856). Two other boys, Jules (1843) and Julien (1845) died in infancy, and a disabled one, Edouard, died in 1876 at age twenty-one.

Eugène, Emile II, Henry and Gustave all studied at École Centrale Paris. Several of the Pereire children married into established families of French haute finance and business elite. Claire in 1853 married Georges Thurneyssen, son of the Protestant banker and Pereire business partner Auguste Thurneyssen. Eugène in 1859 married Juliette Betzi Fould, daughter of Emile Fould, the Pereires' notary and himself a cousin of Achille Fould. Emile II in 1864 married Suzanne Chevalier, daughter of Michel Chevalier's brother Auguste. Henriette married Eugène Mir, a businessman and politician.

Eugène Pereire, Isaac's elder son, led much of the remaining family business upon his father's death in 1880. His granddaughter Noémie Halphen married Maurice de Rothschild from the family of the Pereires' longstanding competitors. Gustave's son Alfred Pereire was a noted historian and bibliographer.

== Business development ==
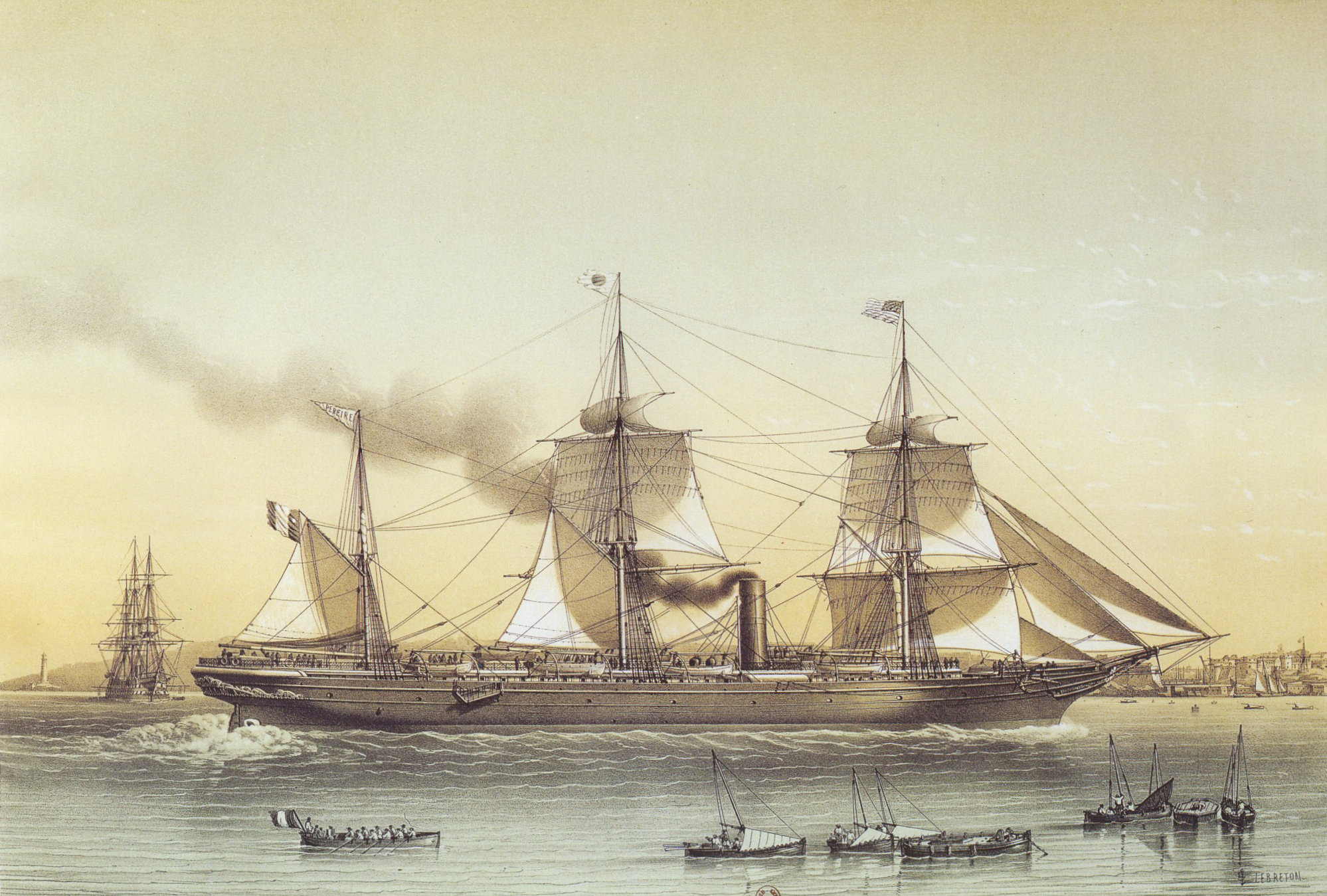
Steamer Pereire-Lebreton of the Pereire's Compagnie Générale Transatlantique

Emile and Isaac Pereire moved from Bordeaux to Paris in 1822 and 1823 respectively, where they initially lived in the house of their uncle Isaac Rodrigues-Henriques, a banker. They became followers of Saint-Simonism. They kept their commitment to Saint-Simonian beliefs despite their break with Barthélemy Prosper Enfantin in the early 1830s.

The Pereire brothers founded a leading business conglomerate. Enterprises created or sponsored by the Pereires included:

- the Compagnie du chemin de fer de Paris à Saint-Germain created in 1835, with service inaugurated in 1837, merged in 1855 into the Pereires' Compagnie des chemins de fer de l'Ouest, one of France's main railways companies, merged in 1908 into the Chemins de fer de l'État
- the Crédit Mobilier bank, founded in 1852 and subsequently the backbone of the Pereire group, taken over by the Banque de France in 1867 following the difficulties of the Compagnie Immobilière
- the Compagnie des chemins de fer du Midi, created in 1852, one of the major French railway companies until their nationalization into SNCF in 1938
- the Château Palmer winery in the Margaux AOC region near Bordeaux, purchased by the Pereires in 1853 and kept in the family until its sale in 1938
- the Compagnie générale des omnibus, created in 1854 to operate Paris's public transport system, merged in 1921 into Société des transports en commun de la région parisienne, now RATP Group
- the Compagnie parisienne de gaz, created in 1855 to operate Paris's gas lighting concession, liquidated in 1905 with the concession's expiry
- the Compagnie Générale Transatlantique shipping company, created in 1855 as Compagnie Générale Maritime, one of the predecessor entities of CMA CGM
- The building later known as Louvre Saint-Honoré, with the Grand Hôtel du Louvre and retail mall Magasins du Louvre on its street level, created in 1855 and at the root of the Groupe du Louvre
- the Compagnie Immobilière de Paris, formed in 1856 and which in 1863 absorbed Jules Mirès's ailing Société des Ports de Marseille, itself taken over by the Banque de France together with the Crédit Mobilier in 1867 and eventually liquidated in 1881
- the fire and accident company La Confiance and the house insurance company La Paternelle, both controlled from 1859, both among the predecessor entities of Axa
- the Entrepôts des magasins généraux de Paris which operated major warehousing facilities in and around Paris, created in 1860, now part of Icade
- The Spanish insurance company El Fénix Español, created in 1864 and merged in 1879 to form La Unión y el Fénix, now part of Allianz

The Pereires were also instrumental in the creation and/or development of businesses they did not effectively control. These included:

- the Comptoir national d'escompte de Paris, created in 1848, one of the main predecessor entities of BNP Paribas
- the Crédit Foncier de France, created in 1852, now part of Groupe BPCE
- the Darmstädter Bank, created in 1853–54, forcibly merged into Dresdner Bank in 1931
- the Imperial Royal Austrian State Railways, created in 1854 and dismantled into national companies in 1918
- the Sociedad de Crédito Mobiliario Español bank, created in Madrid in 1855–1856 and reformed in 1902 as the Banco Español de Crédito, now part of Banco Santander
- the Banque Internationale à Luxembourg, created in 1856
- the Grande société des chemins de fer russes railway company in Russia, created in 1856
- the Compañía de los Caminos de Hierro del Norte de España railway company in Spain, created in 1858 and nationalized in 1941
- the Chantier Scott in Saint-Nazaire, created in 1862 to build ships for the Compagnie Générale Transatlantique, one of the predecessor entities of the Chantiers de l'Atlantique
- the Credito Mobiliare in Turin, taken over by restructuring a former Rothschild venture in 1862 on the model of the Crédit Mobilier, liquidated in 1894 in the crisis context of the formation of the Bank of Italy
- the Imperial Ottoman Bank, reformed in 1863, eventually merged in 2001 into Garanti Bank
- the Crédit Foncier d'Autriche, created in 1864

Even though the Pereires were not involved, their success with the Crédit Mobilier was taken as a model for the creation in 1856 of the Berliner Handels-Gesellschaft, the Allgemeine Deutsche Credit-Anstalt, and the Stockholms Enskilda Bank.

The Pereires also sponsored coal mining developments in Lorraine and Northern France.

== Politics and media ==
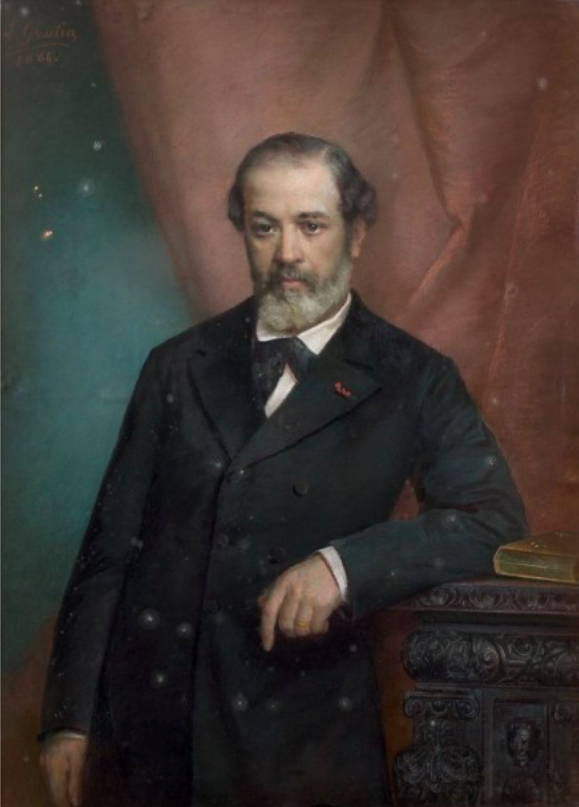
Eugène Pereire by artist Charles Louis Gratia, founder of the Banque Transatlantique

The Pereires were deeply involved in French politics. Emile Pereire was member of Parliament (député) for the département of Gironde between 1863 and 1869. Isaac was similarly député for the Pyrénées-Orientales between 1863 and 1869, and for the Aude in 1869–1870. Isaac's son Eugène was also a député in the Tarn during the same period.

They also maintained a lifelong involvement in public debates through the media. In the 1820s Emile wrote regularly in Le Globe and from 1830, in Le National. In November 1871, Isaac acquired the conservative newspaper La Liberté from Émile de Girardin, and heavily influenced its editorial line in the later 1870s.

== Downfall ==
In the mid-1860s, the Pereires' alliances in the haute finance began to fray. Their attempt to challenge the issue monopoly of the Banque de France through the restructuring of the Bank of Savoy, the note-issuing bank of the former Duchy of Savoy which had come under French rule following the Treaty of Turin (1860), was resented by the Pereires' former associate Adolphe d'Eichthal. In 1866–7, the Pereire group underwent a severe crisis largely triggered by the burden of their developments in Marseille. The Pereires were forced to relinquished control of the Crédit Mobilier on 14 September 1867, at the demand of the Banque de France. Even so, they kept some of their wealth and properties, but had to face numerous lawsuits in the ensuing years and in 1872 were compelled to sell their art collections.

In any case, the Pereires' heyday came to an end with the demise of the Second Empire, with which they had been deeply associated. One of the Second Empire's key political protagonists, Persigny, would thus write in his memoirs:

I wanted an instrument that would free the new regime (the Second Empire) from the tutelage under which financiers usually hold governments, and which would be particularly dangerous as I felt the hostility of the great financial powers-that-be against the new regime. Without a doubt, had the Credit Mobilier not been there to steer and move them forward, the policy of the Empire, as it would have been forced to compromise with the Haute Banque, could not have been as bold and unconstrained as it was.

— Persigny, Mémoires (1896)

== Deaf education ==
By 1860, both brothers' wives were involved with the Central Society for the Education and Assistance of the Deaf and in 1875, Isaac and Émile established the J. R. Pereire Society in 1875 with the hope of re-establishing the vision of their grandfather, Jacob, aiming to "promote the teaching of speech and lipreading, by speech, to the deaf." To this end, they also established a school in 1879, run by French oralist Marius Magnat.

In 1878, as part of the Paris World Fair and with the assistance of the French Ministry of Education, Isaac and Émile organised a congress (the first in a series) on the "improvement of the condition of the deaf".

== Family properties ==
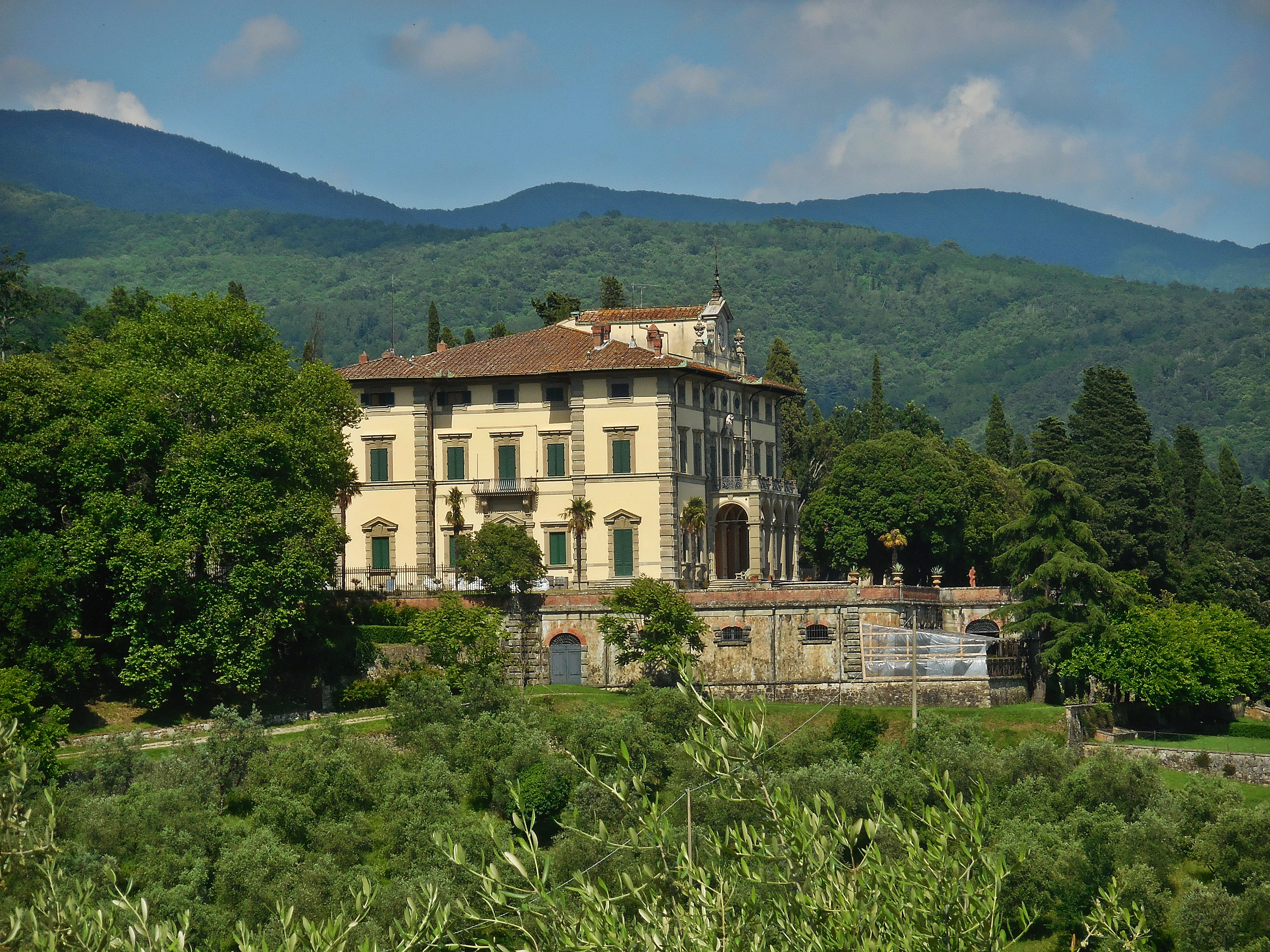
Villa Philipson in Pistoia, Italy, built by Edoardo Philipson and Sophie Rodrigues Pereire, parents of Dino Philipson

In 1852 the Pereires bought a vast estate in Gretz-Armainvilliers and commissioned their favorite architect Alfred Armand to build a palatial country house there in the early 1860s, the Château d'Armainvilliers, to rival the Rothschilds' nearby Château de Ferrières; it was bombed by mistake by the US Air Force in 1944 and demolished in 1950.

In 1854 they purchased the hôtel particulier on 15 Place Vendôme to make it the headquarters of the Crédit Mobilier, and kept it as such until 1867. The same building was transformed into a luxury hotel in 1898 by César Ritz and is now the Hôtel Ritz Paris.

In 1855 they acquired their urban mansion, the Hotel Pereire on 35–37 rue du Faubourg Saint-Honoré, initially built in 1713, and had it extensively renovated until 1859, also by Armand. That property was purchased by the British government in 1947 and is now the Embassy of the United Kingdom in Paris.

Their villa in Arcachon, built in 1863–1854 in their real estate development there, was demolished in 1959.

== Legacy ==
The Pereires were active in real estate development and created some of the most iconic urban landscapes of the era. These included the Gare Saint-Lazare, first opened in 1842 as one of the main railway stations in Paris; the Parc Monceau neighborhood in Paris, on grounds around the park which they purchased from the Orléans family in 1861; the Rue de la République in Marseille, started by Jules Mirès and continued by the Pereires; and the holiday resort of Arcachon, developed from 1862.

The Boulevard Pereire in Paris, above the Pereires’ ligne d’Auteuil, was given their name in 1863, an extremely rare distinction for living individuals. The nearby Place du Maréchal-Juin was called Place Pereire until 1973. In the same neighborhood, the Pereire Metro Station and Pereire–Levallois RER station also carry their name. Other public spaces bearing the Pereires' name are in Arcachon (Plage Pereire, avenue du Parc Pereire, allée Emile Pereire), Bayonne (place Pereire), Bordeaux (rue Emile Pereire), Rueil-Malmaison (rue Pereire), and Saint-Germain-en-Laye (rue Pereire). The former avenue Pereire in Asnières-sur-Seine has been renamed after native son Henri Barbusse.

The Bourbon rose Madame Isaac Pereire, bred in 1881 by Armand Garcon, is named after Isaac's second wife, Fanny.

== Gallery ==
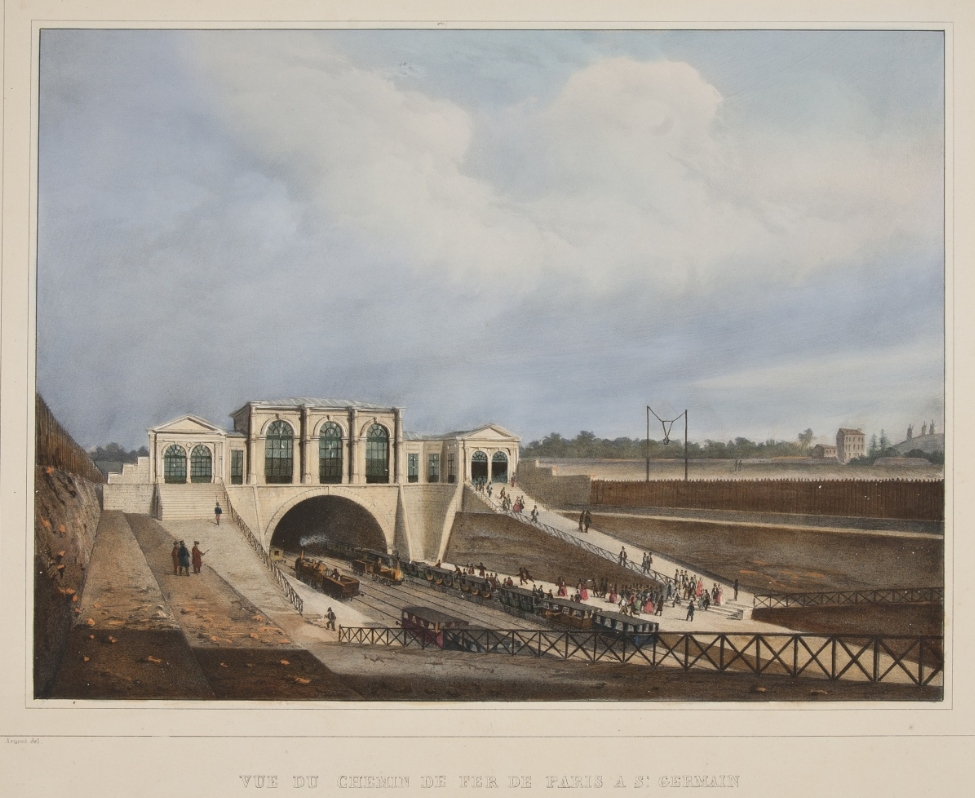
Original station of the Compagnie du chemin de fer de Paris à Saint-Germain on Place de l'Europe, 1837

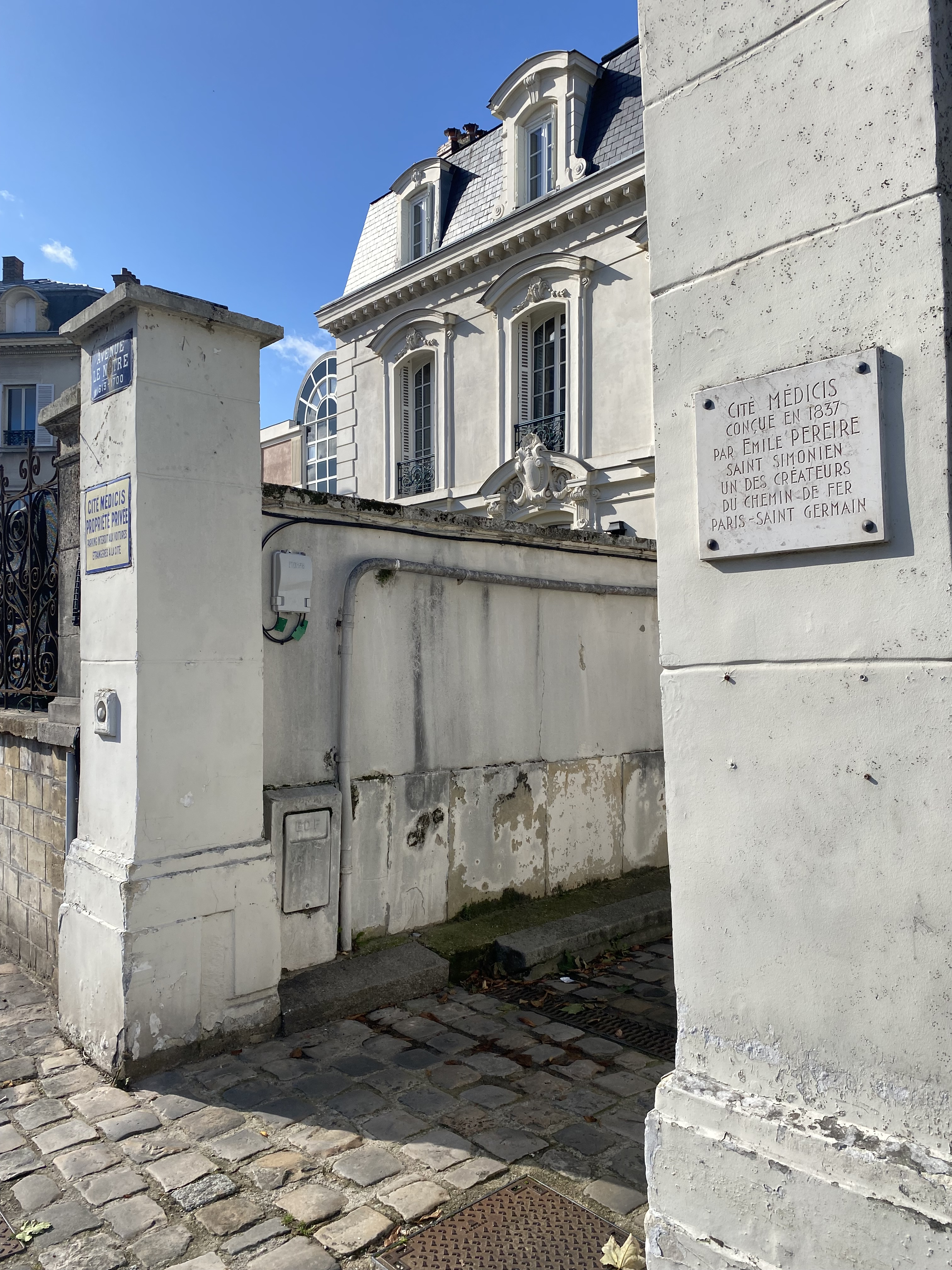
Plaque in Saint-Germain-en-Laye highlighting Émile Pereire's role in developing the Cité Médicis neighborhood above the new railway in 1837

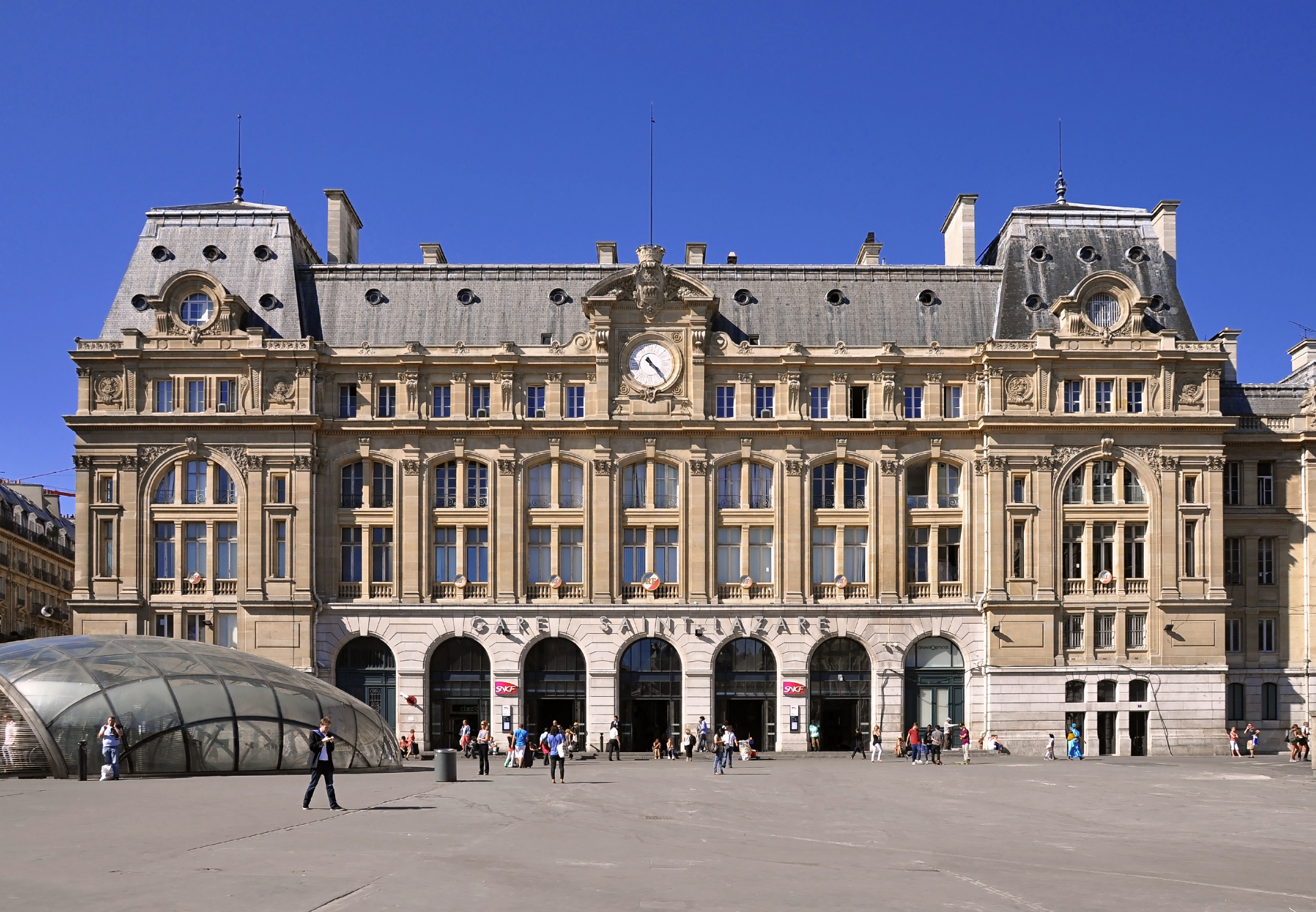
Gare Saint-Lazare in Paris, the terminal of the Pereires' Chemins de fer de l'Ouest created in the early 1840s

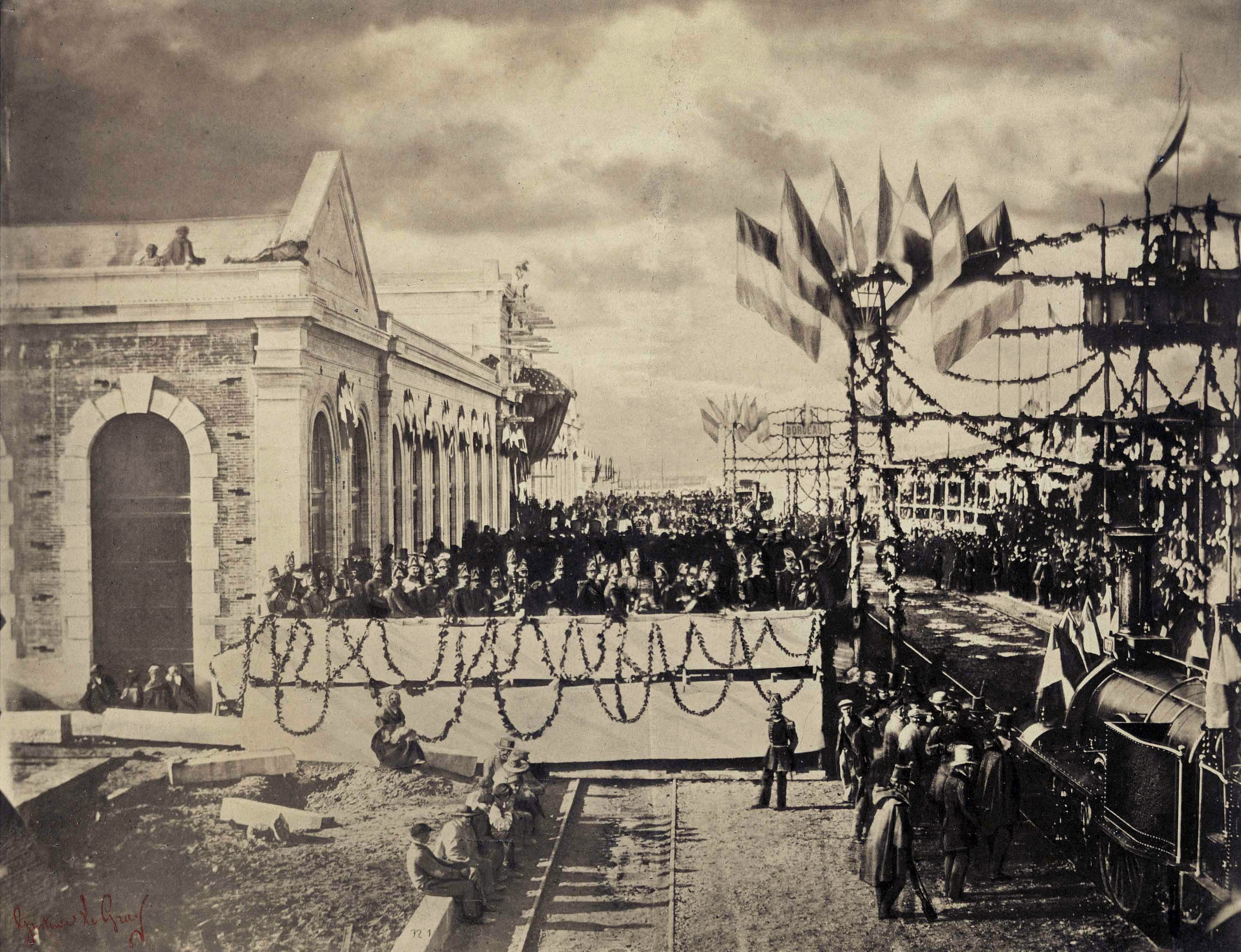
Toulouse-Matabiau station created by the Pereires for the Chemins de fer du Midi, 1857

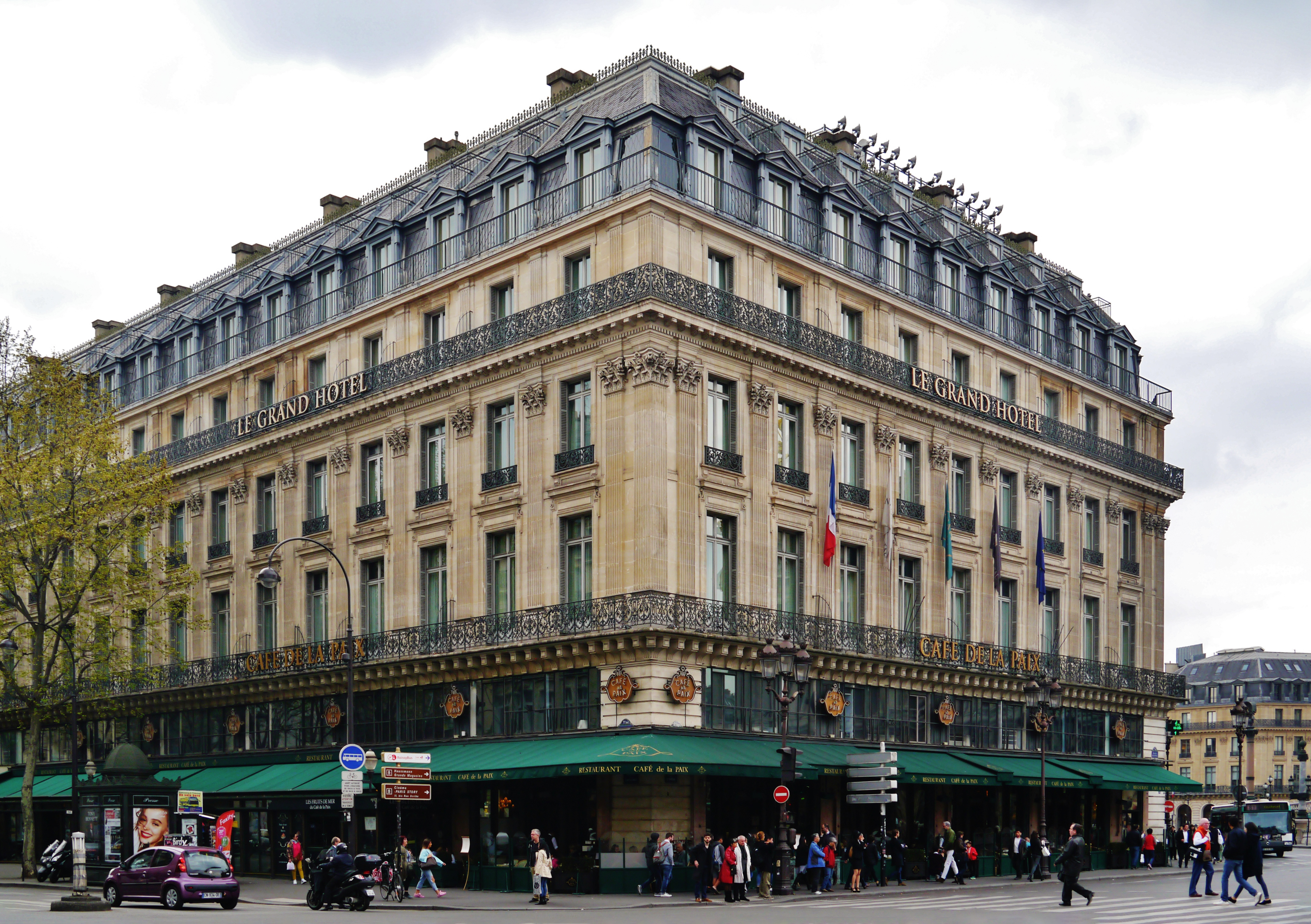
The Pereires' Grand Hôtel, now InterContinental Paris Le Grand Hotel (1862), with the Café de la Paix on the street level

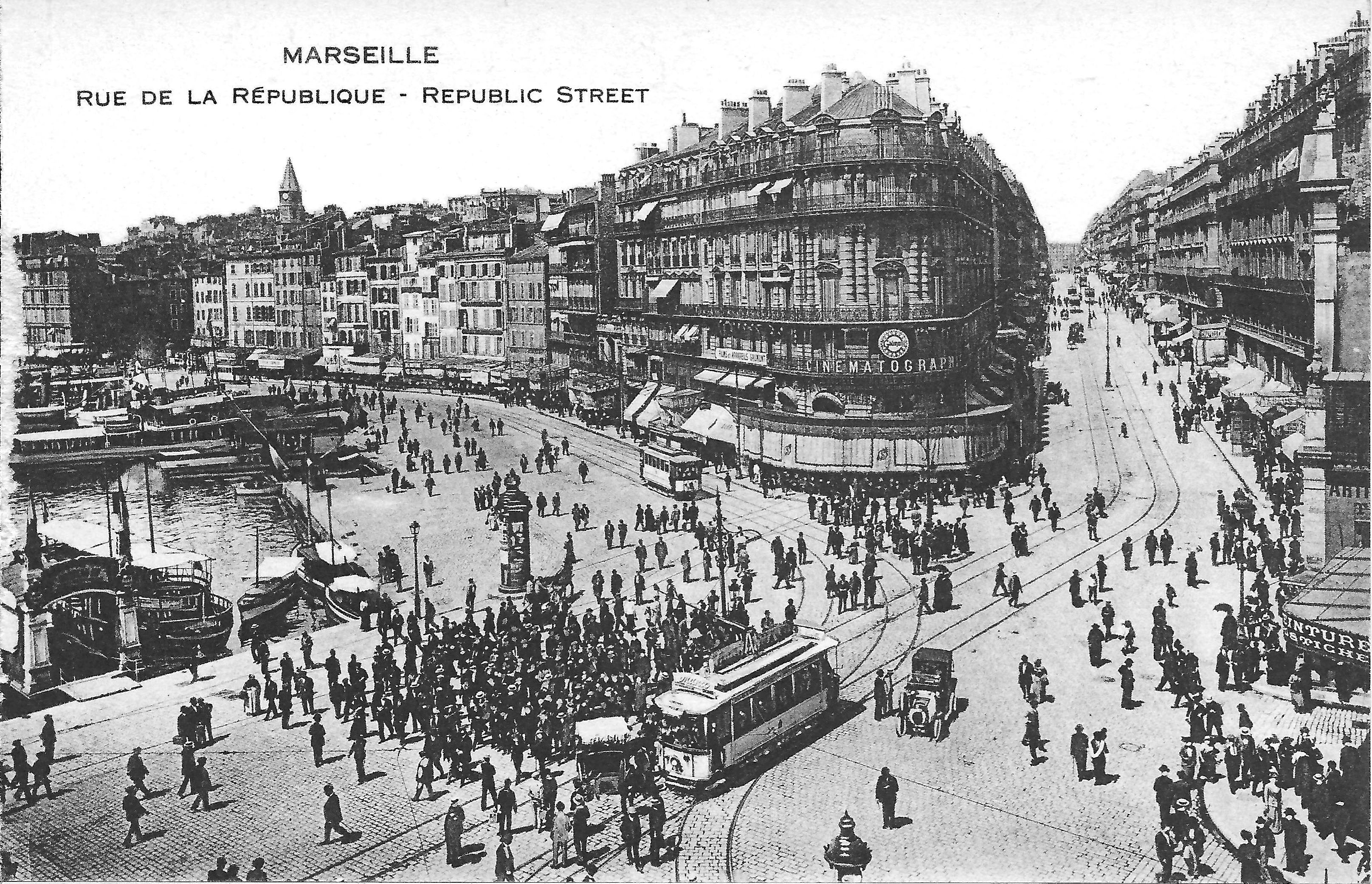
The rue Impériale (on the right), now Rue de la République in Marseille

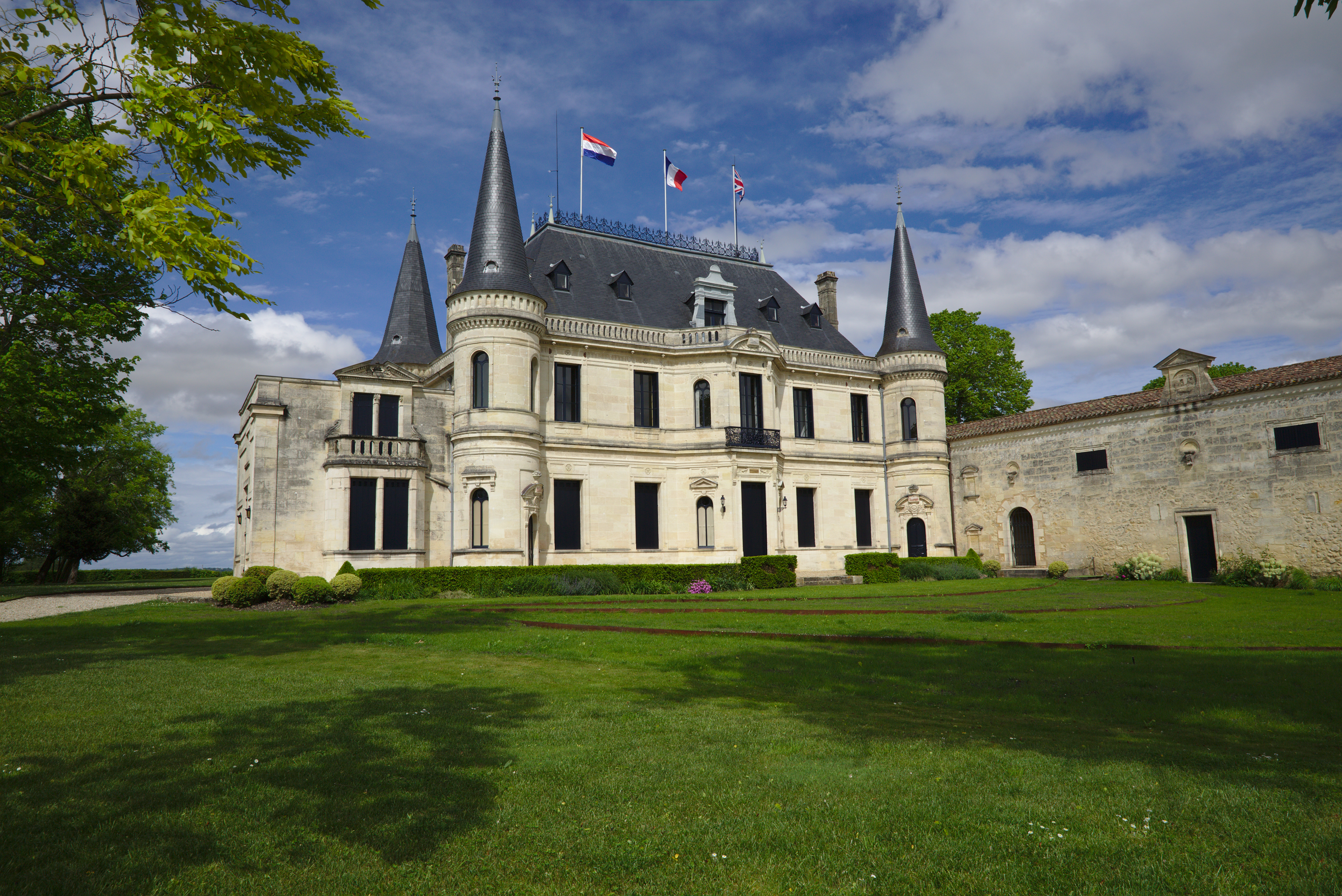
Château Palmer

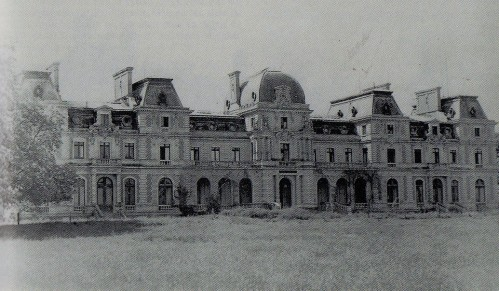
The former Pereire country house in Gretz-Armainvilliers

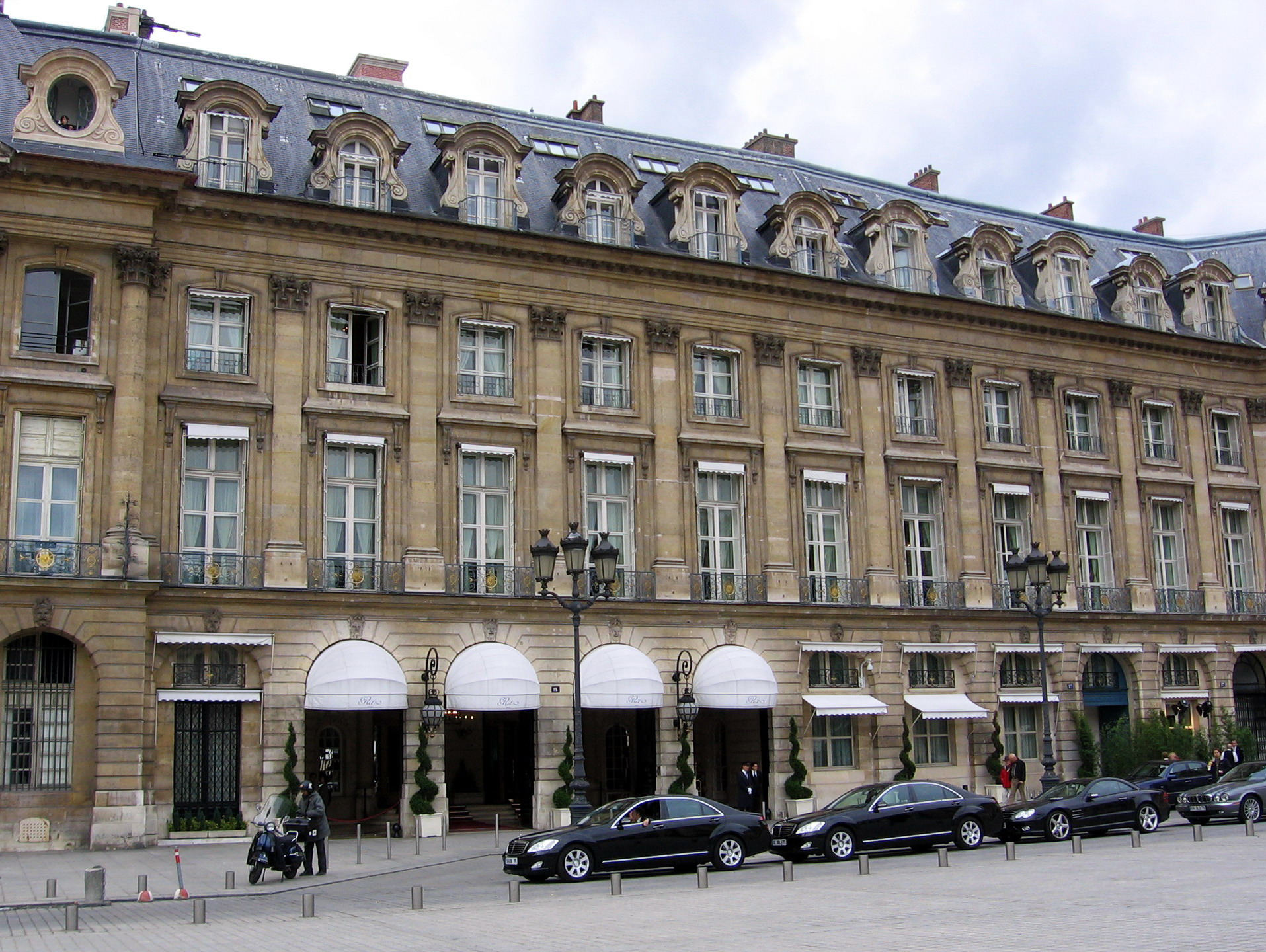
Former headquarters of the Crédit Mobilier, now Hôtel Ritz Paris

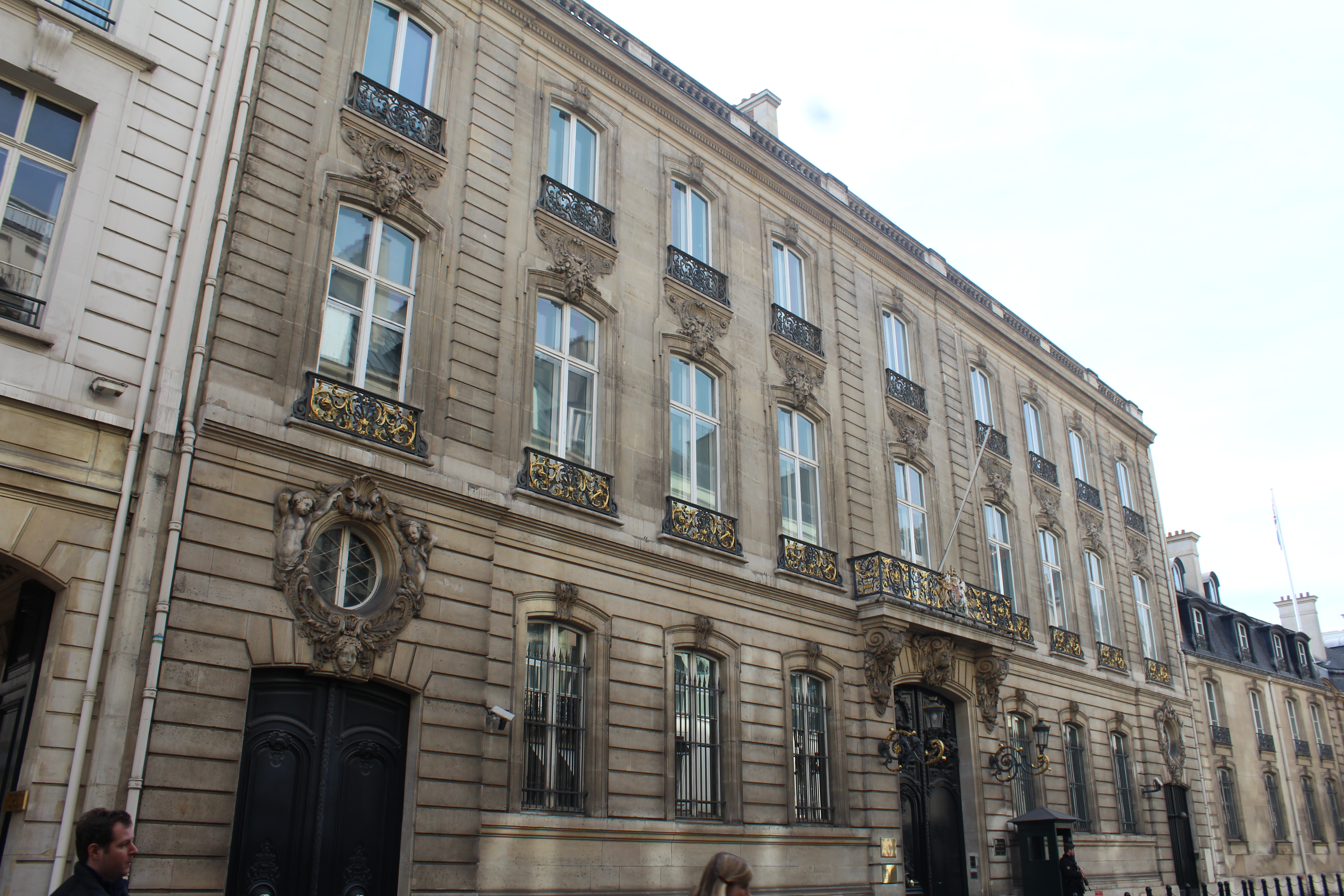
The Hotel Pereire on rue du Faubourg Saint-Honoré

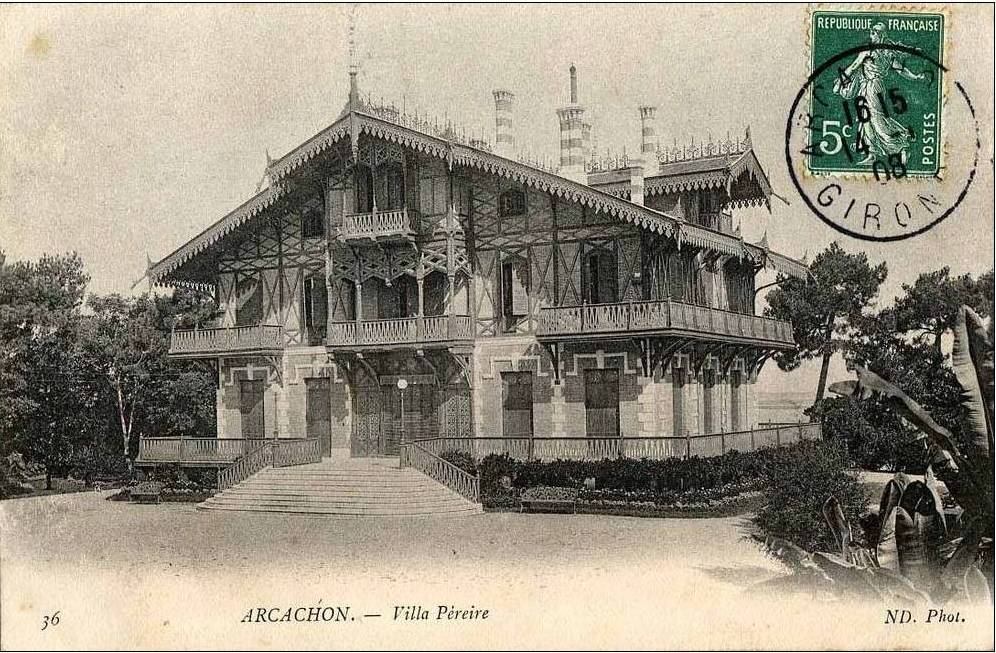
The former Pereire Villa in Arcachon

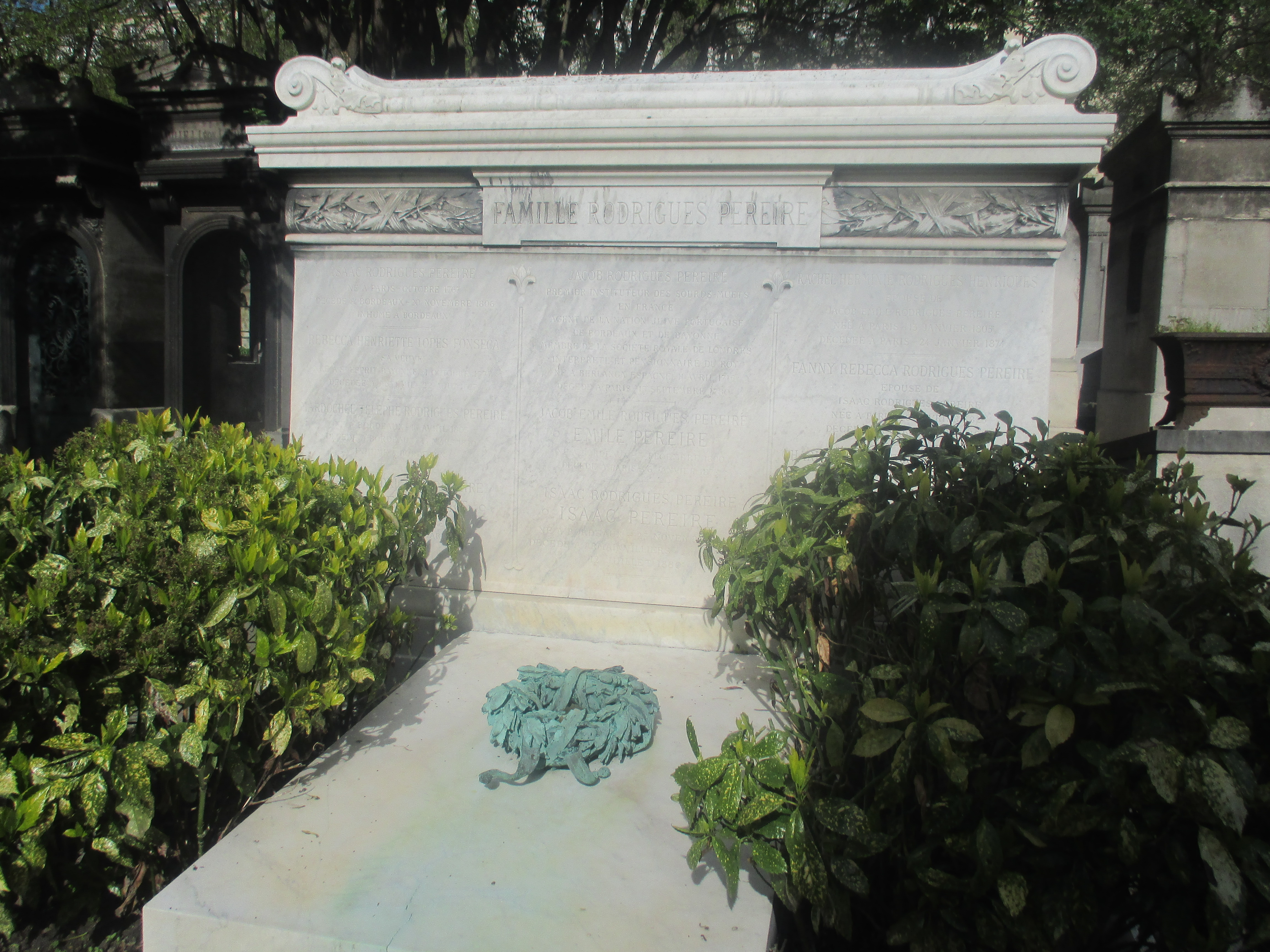
Burial place of the Pereire-Rodrigues family including Emile and Isaac Pereire, Montmartre Cemetery, Paris

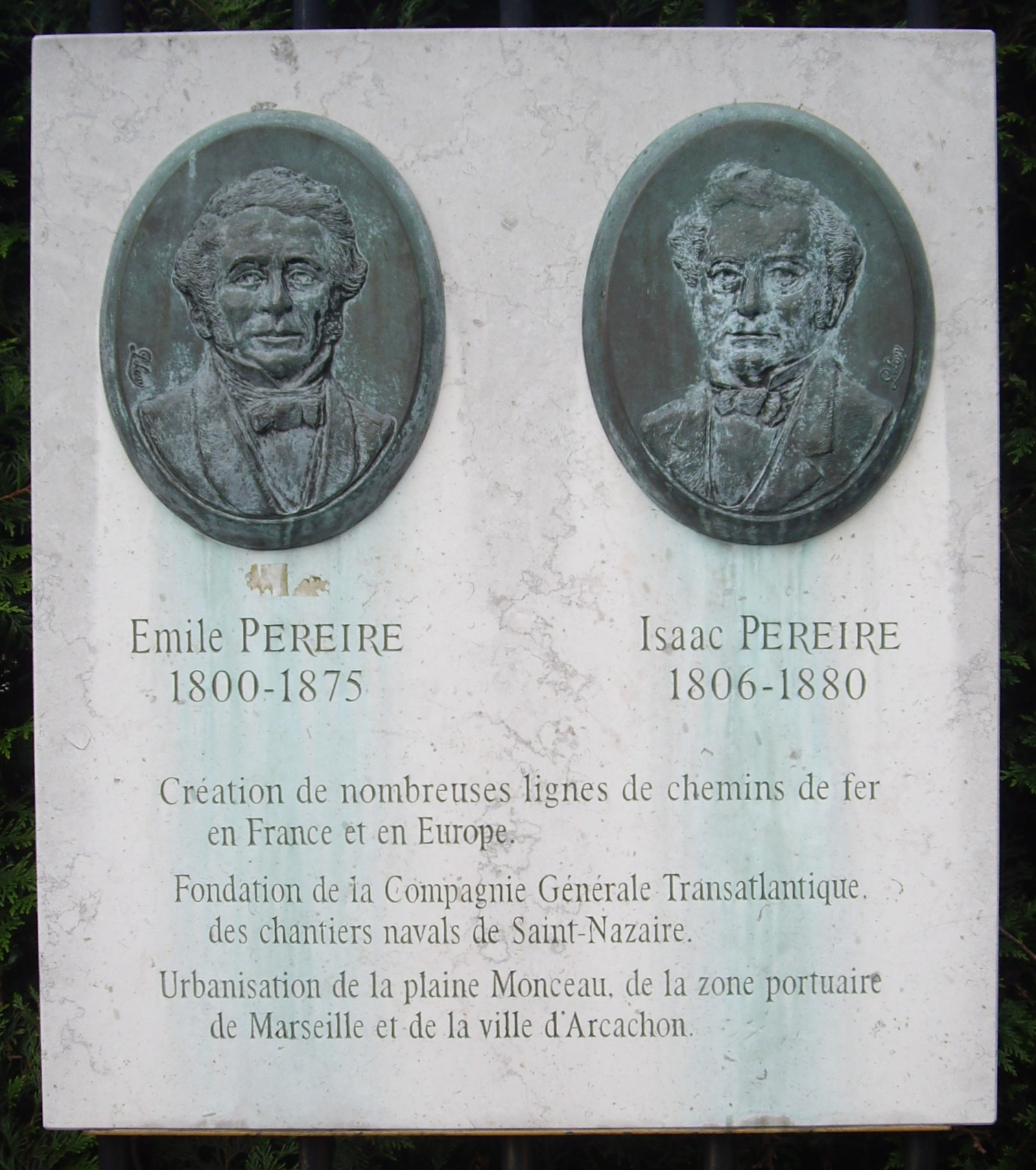
Memorial plaque on Place du Maréchal-Juin in Paris, named Place Pereire until 1973

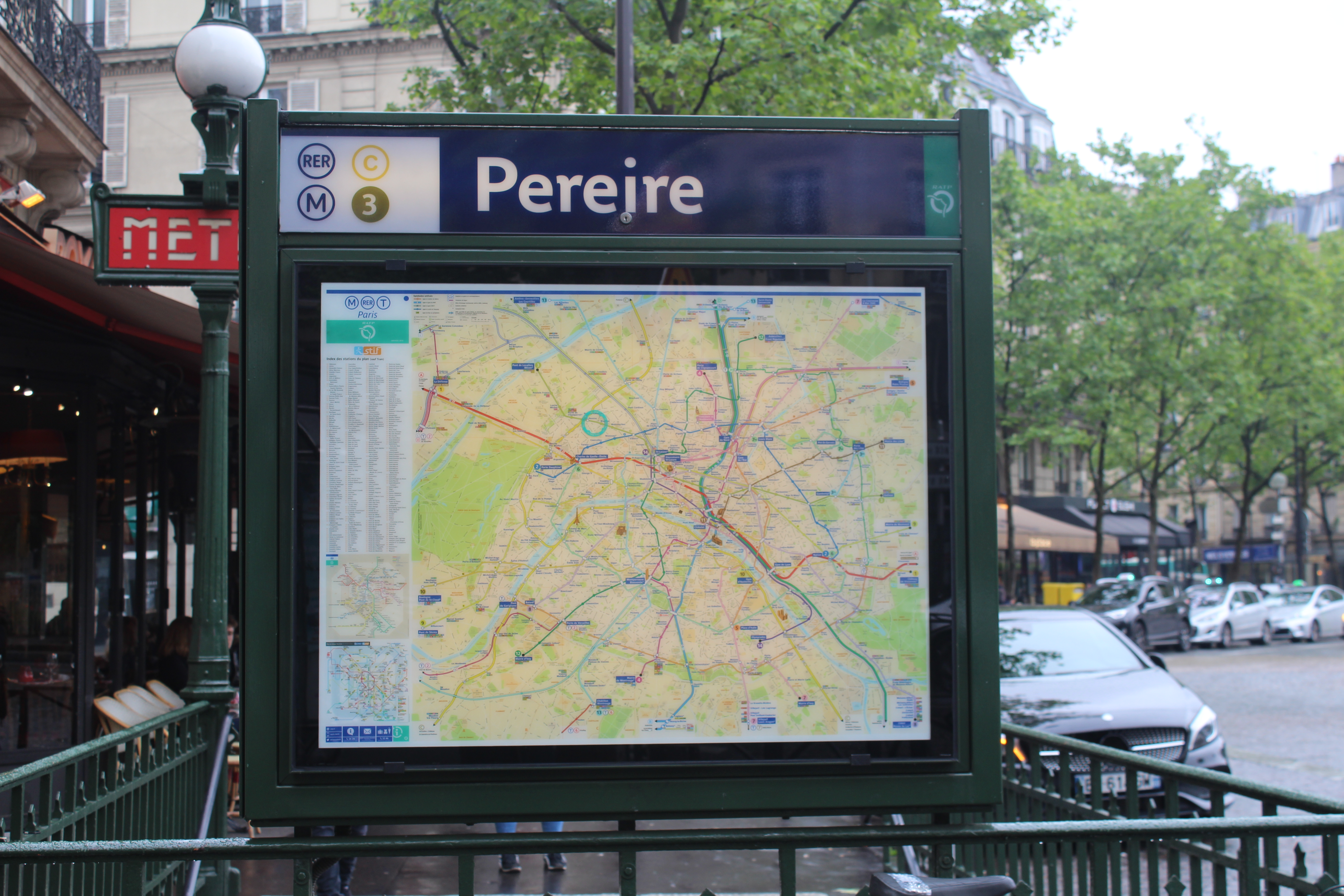
Pereire Metro Station in Paris

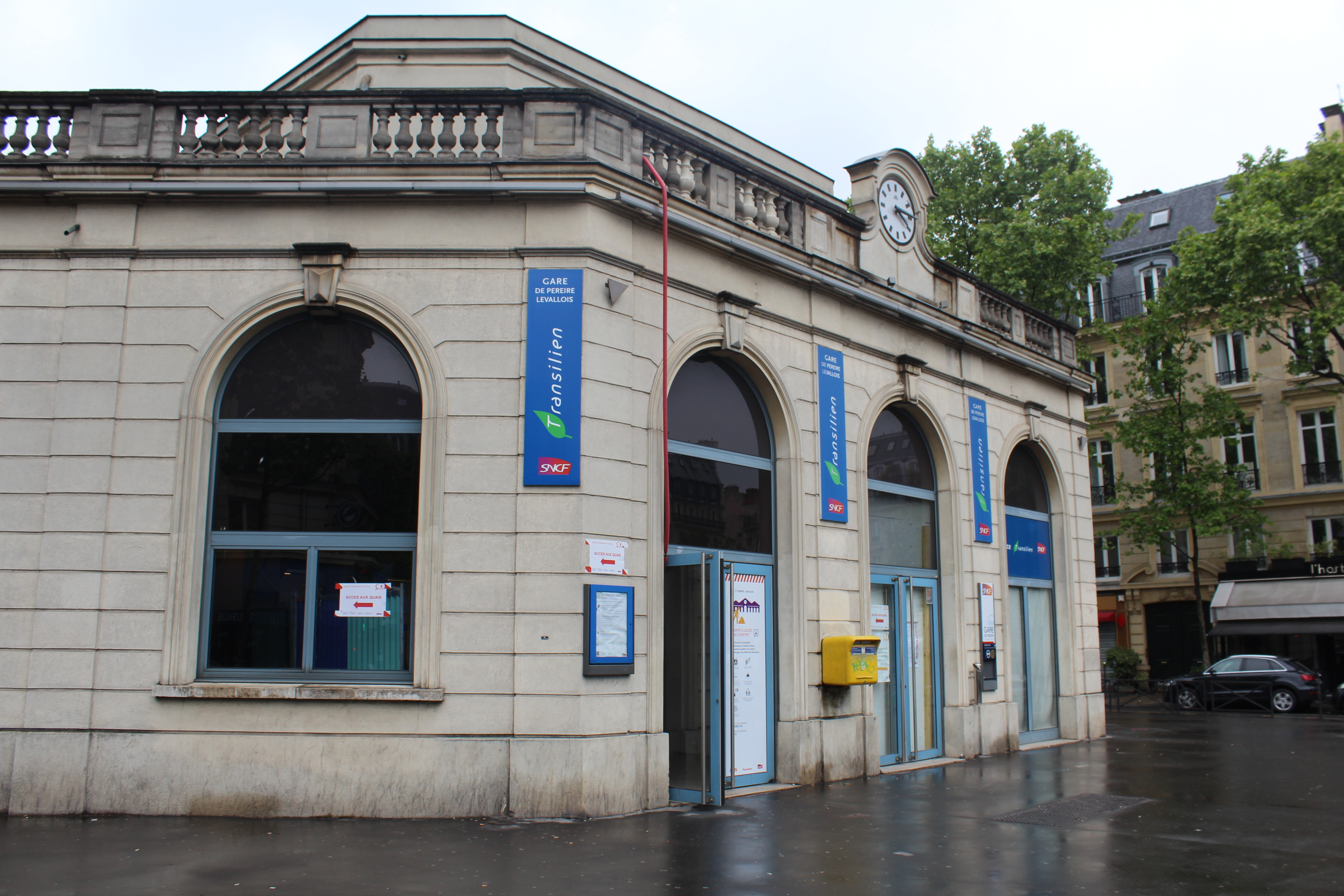
Pereire Levallois RER station in Paris

== See also ==
- Rothschild family
- Compagnie du chemin de fer Grand-Central de France
- Crédit Mobilier of America scandal
