= Eugène Pereire =

Eugène Péreire
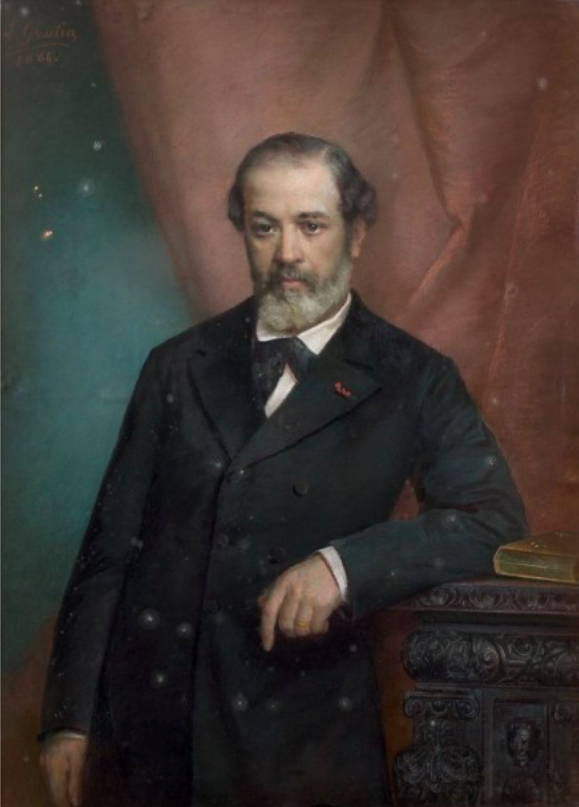
- Péreire by Charles Louis Gratia (1884)
- Born: 1 October 1831; Paris, France
- Died: 21 March 1908 (aged 76); Paris, France
- Occupation: Financier
- Spouse: Juliette Fould (m. 1857)

Eugène Péreire (1 October 1831 – 21 March 1908) was a French financier and politician of Sephardic Jewish origin from Portugal. The son of Isaac Pereire of the prominent Pereire brothers, he founded Banque Transatlantique in 1881.

In 1857, Péreire married Juliette Fould of the Fould family. They had two daughters:

1. Alice Pereire (1858–1931), married to Salomon Halfon, President of Banque Transatlantique 1909–23
2. Marie Pereire (1860–1936), married to Jules Halphen, son of Eugène Halphen of the Halphen family

Péreire was a member of parliament for the Tarn department from 1863 to 1869.
