= Crédit Mobilier =

19th-century French banking company

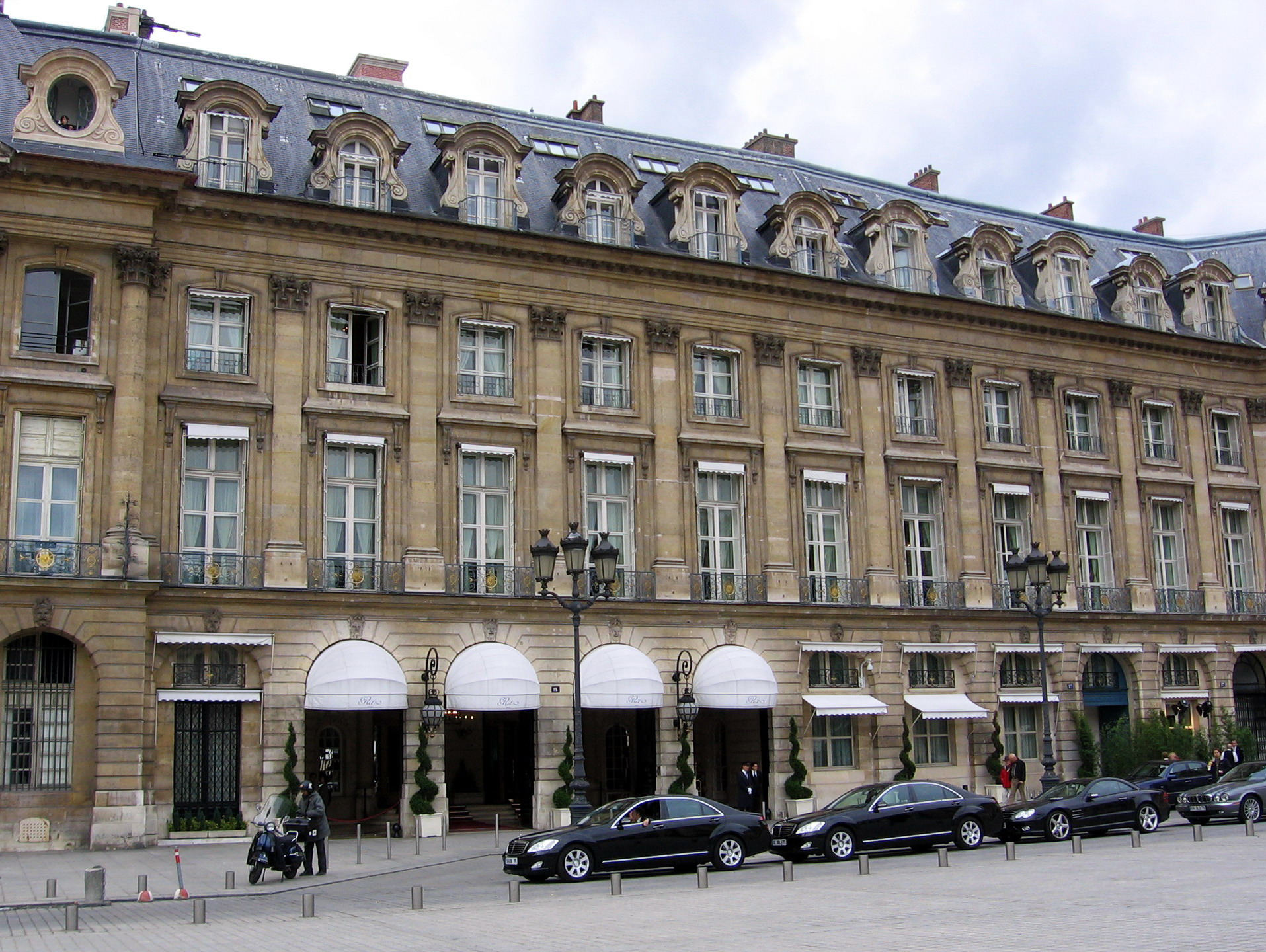
Former seat of the Crédit Mobilier on Place Vendôme in Paris, since 1898 the Hôtel Ritz

The Crédit Mobilier (French pronunciation: [kʁedi mɔbilje]; officially the Société Générale du Crédit Mobilier [sɔsjete ʒeneʁal dy kʁedi mɔbilje], lit. 'general company for movable [collateral-backed] credit') was a French banking company created in 1852 by the Pereire brothers, and one of the world’s most significant and influential financial institutions in the mid-19th century.

The Crédit Mobilier had a major role in the financing of numerous railroads and other infrastructure projects by mobilizing the savings of middle class French investors as capital for vast lending schemes. Its operations resulted in vast debts for the countries which accepted its infrastructure loans, and the bank was thus indirectly involved in European encroachment on countries whose governments subsequently defaulted on these loans, not least during the worldwide economic depression of the 1870s.

It became a powerful and dynamic funding agent for major projects in France, Europe, North Africa and the world at large. As Napoleon III redeveloped Paris, the Crédit Mobilier speculated on real estate with inside information and collaborated with Baron Haussmann to develop neighborhoods such as rue de Rivoli, Opéra, and place de l'Etoile. Beyond France, it specialized in mining and railway development, for which it also funded or sponsored other banks including the Imperial Ottoman Bank and the Austrian Mortgage Bank, as well as insurance companies and building contractors. The bank had large investments in transatlantic steamship lines, urban gas lighting, a newspaper and the Paris public transit system.

In 1866–1867, the bank underwent a severe crisis and the Pereire brothers were forced to resign at the demand of their longtime adversaries in the Banque de France. The Crédit Mobilier never recovered its former importance.

== Creation, development and collapse ==
Established in 1852, the French Government sanctioned the statutes of the new bank with the name of the Société Générale du Crédit Mobilier, with a capital of 60,000,000 francs. It was permitted to issue obligations up to ten times its assets – 600 million francs of debt for 60 million francs of equity. It was founded by the Pereire brothers with a view to countering James Mayer Rothschild's alliance with the industrialist Paulin Talabot regarding competition for the railway expansion. It was allowed to acquire shares of public companies, and to pay calls made upon it in respect of such shares by its own notes or obligations; also to sell or give in security all shares thus acquired. The operations of the society were conducted upon a very extensive scale. A joint-stock company operating on a principle of limited liability, its initial investments came from large industrialists, but its capital was vastly increased by accepting investments from the general public.

In 1854, it subscribed largely to the war loan of the French government, raised during the Crimean War, to the Grand Central Railway Company, to the General Omnibus Company of Paris, and to various other important projects. The dividend declared for 1854 was 12%. In 1855, it lent two sums to the government—the one of 250,000,000 and the other of 375,000,000 francs. Its operations were vast during this year, and the net dividend declared amounted to 40%. The directors then proposed to avail themselves of their privilege of issuing their own obligations, and thought to issue two kinds of notes – the one at short dates, the other at long dates, and redeemable by installments. The proposed issue was to amount to 240,000,000 francs, but the public became alarmed at the prospect of so vast an issue of paper money, and in March 1856, the French government deemed it necessary to prohibit the proposed scheme.

The prohibition was a severe blow to the institution. In 1856, its dividends did not exceed 22%; in 1857, they were only 5%. Further blows were dealt to the bank's equilibrium by the revelation of fraudulent billing practices--remembered as the Credit Mobilier scandal--conducted through the shell company Credit Mobilier of America during the construction of the Union Pacific Railroad. This fracas with the transcontinental ralilroad's financing sunk the company's stock, and is generally remembered as a prime specimen of the financial misconduct that sparked the long depression. Several attempts to resuscitate its credit failed, and finally, in November 1871, it was reorganized with a new board of management. In 1877, its assets were 77,000,000 francs, but its shares, the par value of which was 500 francs, sold for 200 francs only. During 1878–79, the capital was first reduced to 32,000,000 francs, and then increased to 40,000,000. In 1884, it was for a second time reduced to 30,000,000 francs, but the company never regained its losses.

== Crédit Mobilier Français ==
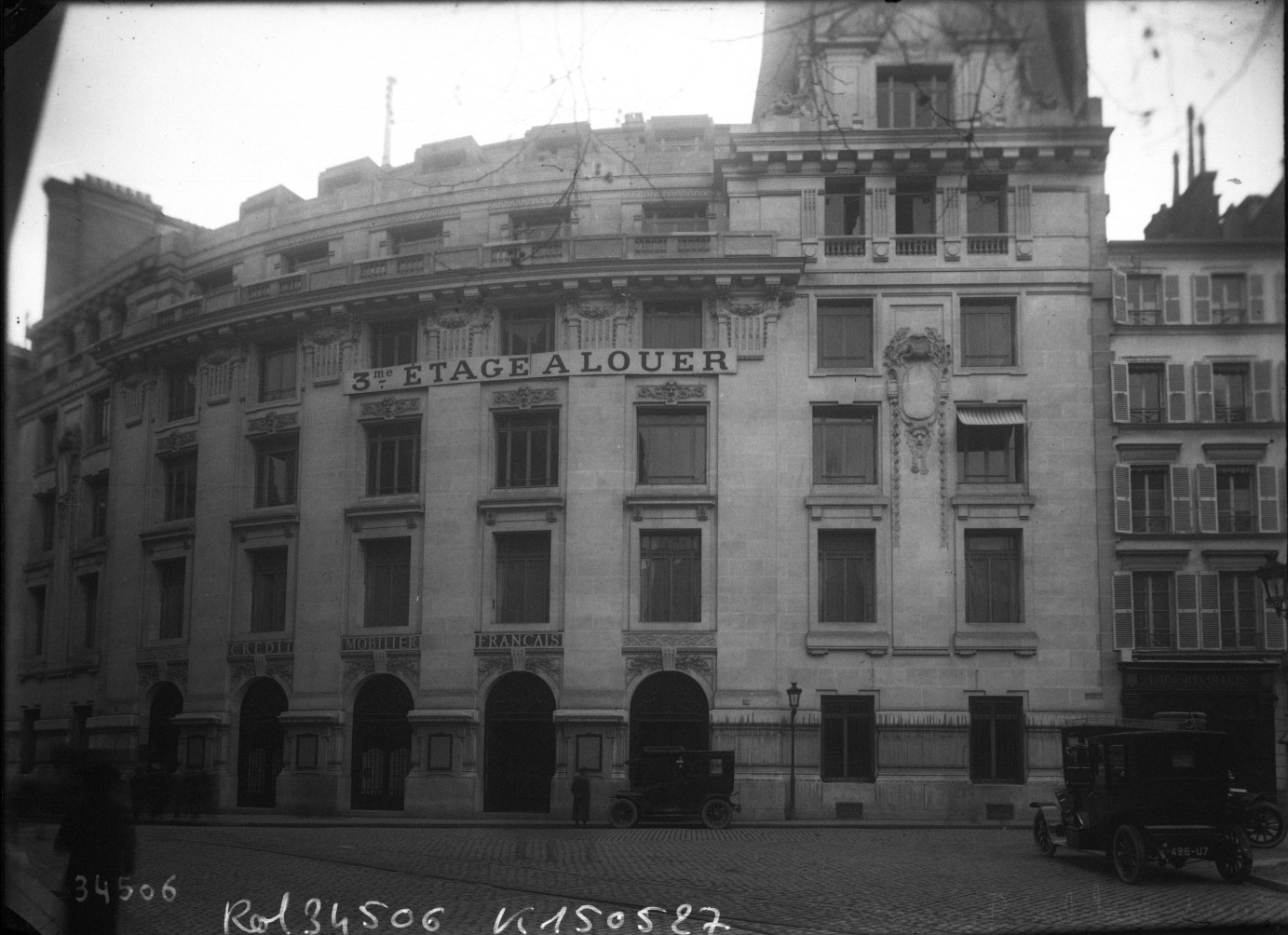
Headquarters of Crédit Mobilier Français in 1913

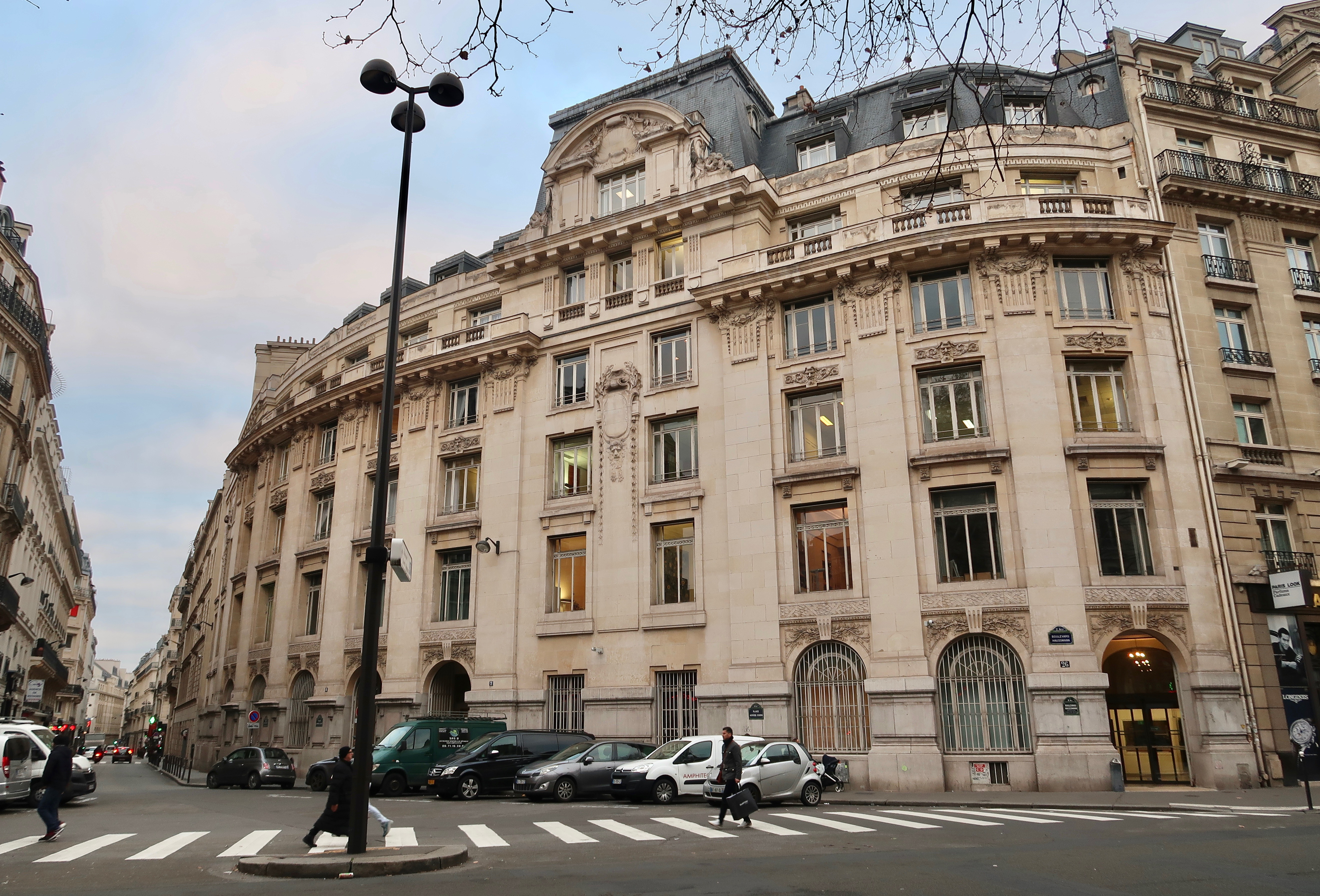
The same building today

In 1902, a group of investors led by Jacques de Lapisse acquired control of the Crédit Mobilier from the Pereire family and merged it with the Office des Rentiers, adopting the name Crédit mobilier français (CMF) for the merged entity. The CMF was initially headquartered at 3–5, rue Saint-Georges in the former seat of the Banque internationale de Paris, and moved in 1912 to a larger building at 30-32, rue Taitbout and 26, boulevard Haussmann, which is now the seat of the Fédération française des sociétés d'assurances.

The CMF was merged in May 1932 with the Banque de l'Union Parisienne (BUP) which was itself facing doubts about its financial soundness, at the initiative of a consortium that included the Société Générale de Belgique, by then a major shareholder of the BUP.

== See also ==
- Saint-Simonianism
- List of banks in France
