= Alfred Pereire =

French historian and bibliographer

Alfred-Isaac Pereire (30 January 1879, Paris – 28 November 1957, Paris, aged 78) was a 20th-century French historian and bibliographer.

== Biography ==
The son of Gustave Pereire and grandson of Isaac Pereire, he was conscripted during the First World War from 1914 to 1918.

He was the founder and general secretary of the Société des amis de la Bibliothèque nationale de France and organized several exhibitions at the Bibliothèque nationale. He was also general secretary of the Association des bibliothécaires français.

He was of Portuguese-Jewish descent.

== Publications (selection) ==
- 1906: Des Premiers rapports entre Saint-Simon et Auguste Comte : d'après des documents originaux (1817-1819)
- 1912: Autour de Saint-Simon : documents originaux : Saint-Simon, Auguste Comte et les deux lettres dites "anonymes". Saint-Simon et l'Entente cordiale. Un secrétaire inconnu de Saint-Simon. Saint-Simon et les frères Péreire
- 1933: Un florilège des beaux livres français
- 1934: A propos d'une édition originale rarissime de Ronsard
- 1937: Vie de Pie XI
- 1949: L'universalité de l'art

== Sources ==
- Henri Temerson, Biographies des principales personnalités françaises décédées au cours de l'année, Hachette, 1958
- Régis Tettamanzi, Esthétique de l'outrance: Annexes, 1999
