= Gretz-Armainvilliers =

- Commune
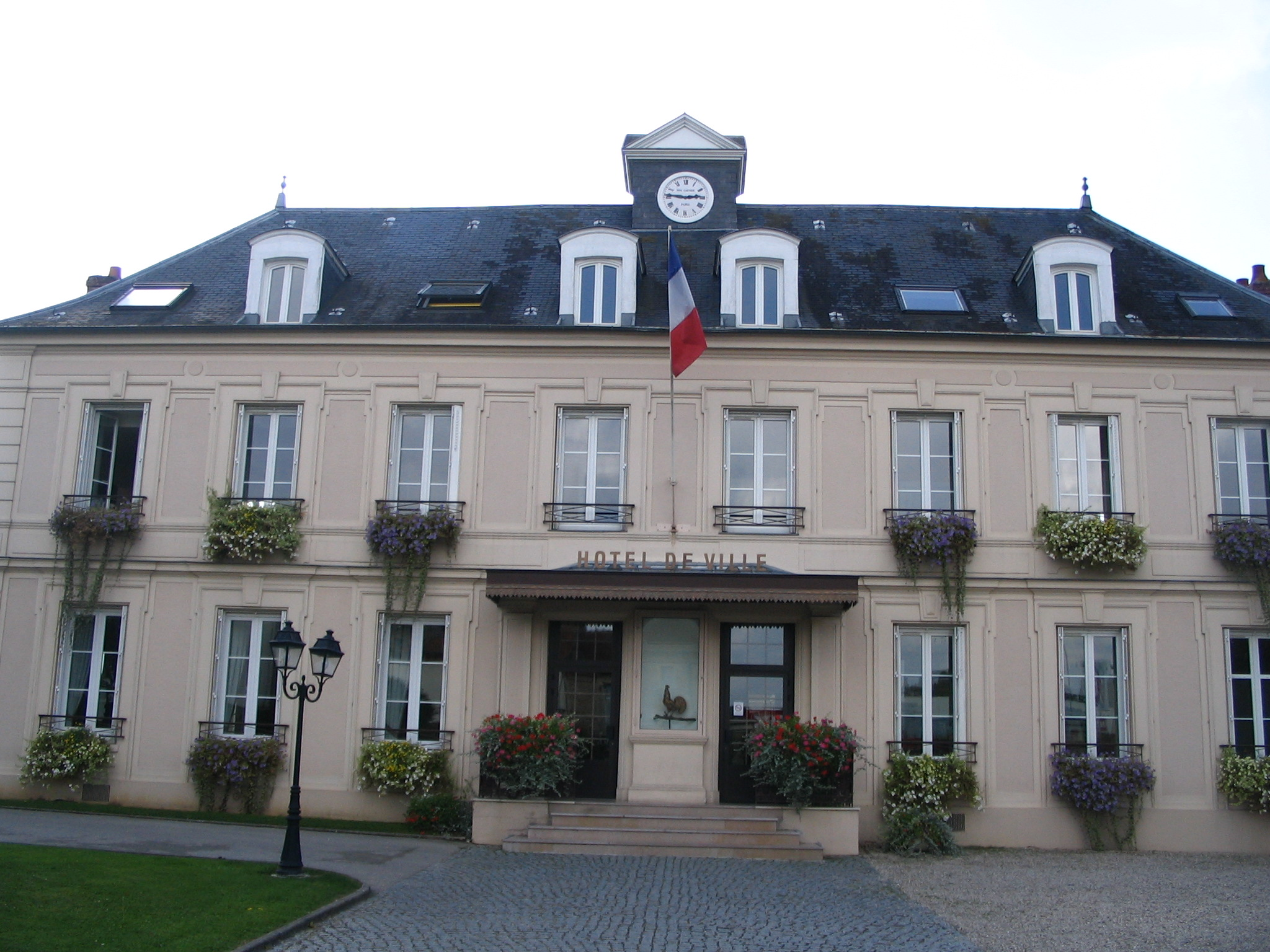
- The town hall of Gretz-Armainvilliers

- Coat of arms

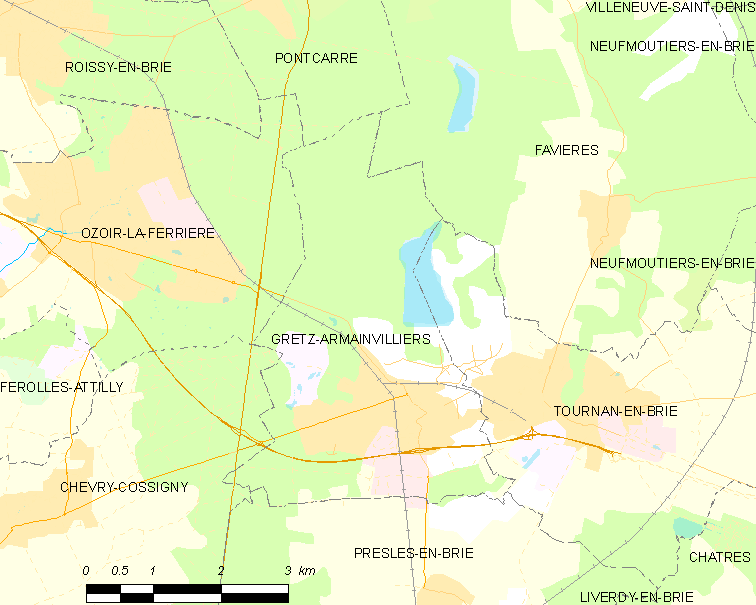
- Location of Gretz-Armainvilliers
- Location within France Location within Île-de-France (region)
- Coordinates: 48°44′30″N 2°44′06″E
- Country: France
- Region: Île-de-France
- Department: Seine-et-Marne
- Arrondissement: Torcy
- Canton: Ozoir-la-Ferrière
- Intercommunality: Les Portes Briardes Entre Ville et Forêts

Government
  - Mayor (2020–2026): Jean-Paul Garcia Robin
- Area^{1}: 13.51 km^{2} (5.22 sq mi)
- Highest elevation: 114 m (374 ft)
- Lowest elevation: 86 m (282 ft)
- Population (2023): 8,825
  - Density: 653.2/km^{2} (1,692/sq mi)
- Time zone: UTC+01:00 (CET)
  - Summer (DST): UTC+02:00 (CEST)
- INSEE/Postal code: 77215 /77220
- ^{1} French Land Register data, which excludes lakes, ponds, glaciers > 1 km^{2} (0.386 sq mi or 247 acres) and river estuaries.

Gretz-Armainvilliers (French pronunciation: [gʁɛts aʁmɛ̃vilje]) is a commune in the Seine-et-Marne department in the Île-de-France region in north-central France.

== Demographics ==
Inhabitants are called Gretzois in French.

Historical population
Year	Pop.	±% p.a.
1968	4,559	—
1975	7,127	+6.59%
1982	7,330	+0.40%
1990	7,246	−0.14%
1999	7,613	+0.55%
2007	7,796	+0.30%
2012	8,237	+1.11%
2017	8,657	+1.00%
2023	8,825	+0.32%
Source: INSEE

== See also ==
- Communes of the Seine-et-Marne department
