= Château Mont-Royal =

Castle and hotel in Hauts-de-France, France

Coordinates: 49°7′34″N 2°32′58″E

- Building in 2005
- Interactive map of the Château Mont-Royal area

General information
- Type: Castle
- Location: La Chapelle-en-Serval, Oise, France
- Construction stopped: 1908
- Inaugurated: 1990 as hotel
- Renovated: 1989

Design and construction
- Architect: Buillaume Tronchet

Website
- montroyal-chantilly.tiara-hotels.com/en/

The Château Mont-Royal is a French castle in La Chapelle-en-Serval, Oise, built for Fernand Halphen by the architect Guillaume Tronchet, and currently used as the Chateau Hotel Mont Royal.

== History ==
The building was to offer his wife a view which enchanted her, he said that Fernand Halphen bought the house at la Chapelle-en-Serval, near Chantilly (Oise) and decided in 1908 to erect a country house in a wooded valley there, which became known as the Château Mont-Royal. After having rejected the project with the Anglo-Norman style of the architect René Sergent, then the first project of a mediaeval style of the architect Guillaume Tronchet (drawings in the Musée d'Orsay), Halphen chose Tronchet's second plan, of a castle celebrating hunting on the outside and music on the inside.

Constructed from 1907 to 1911, the castle (transformed into a hotel by Jean Pierre Hermier in 1989) was a great architectural success.

Under the façades, the bas-reliefs made by Georges Gardet celebrate the pleasures of the hunt. The interior includes, notably, a theatre, a replica of that of the Opéra-Comique.

During the Second World War, the castle was emptied of its furniture and vandalized. In 1989, J.P. Hermier bought it from the descendants of Fernand Halphen and had it transformed into a hotel, which opened its doors in 1990. In June 1992, the Concorde hotel group acquired the entire property. The hotel has one hundred and nine rooms including five suites, a restaurant and an indoor swimming pool.
