= Guillaume Tronchet =

French architect

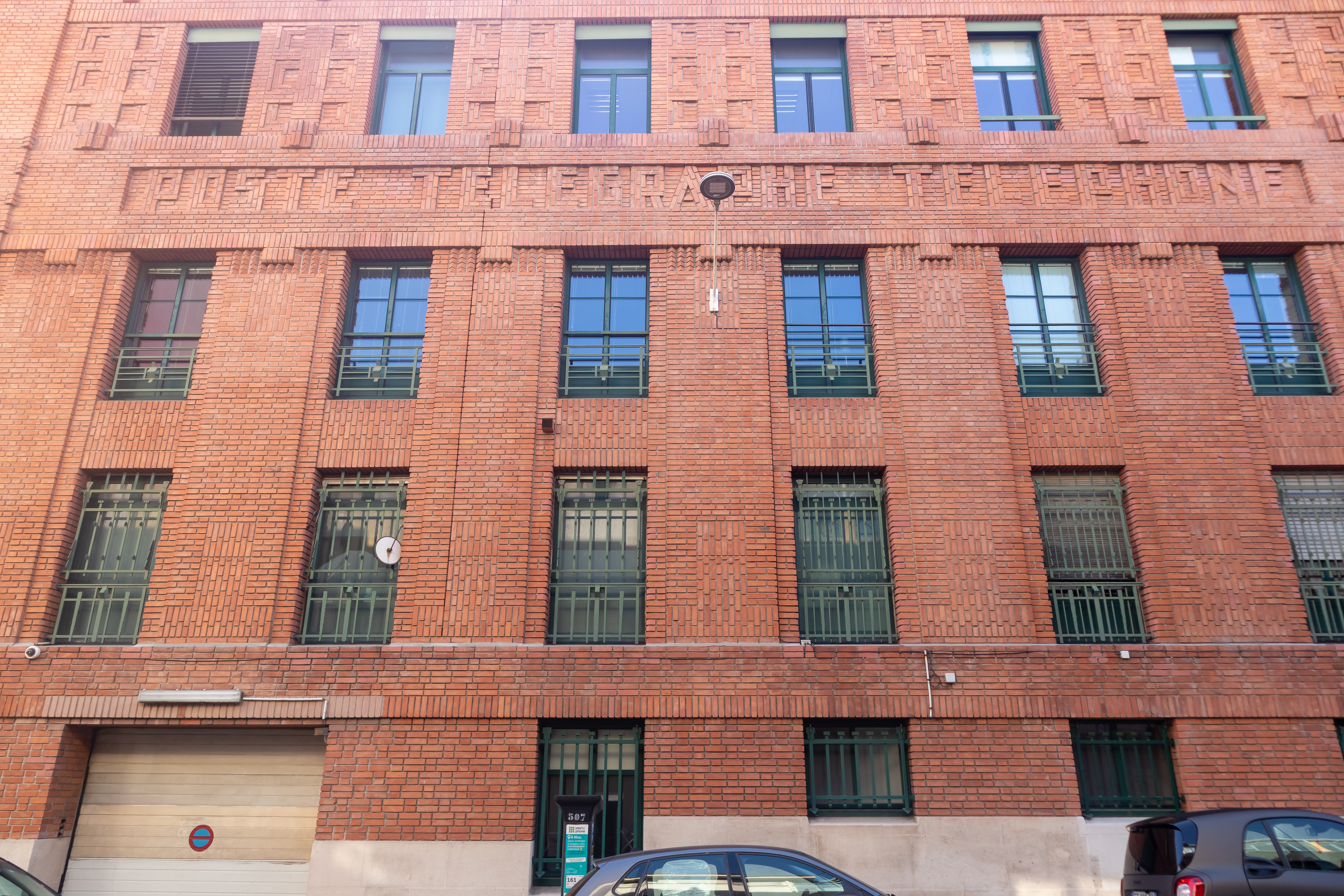
Brick facade of the Nice Post office by Tronchet

Guillaume Tronchet (22 October 1867 – 7 February 1959) was a French architect. His work was part of the architecture event in the art competition at the 1928 Summer Olympics.

== Life ==
Tronchet was born in Villeneuve-sur-Lot, Lot-et-Garonne. He studied at the École des Beaux-Arts de Paris in the studio of Louis-Jules André, then in 1890 in that of Victor Laloux. Gaining his diploma in 1891, in 1892 he won the Deuxième Second Grand Prix de Rome with his design entitled "Un musée d'artillerie".

For Fernand Halphen he built the château Mont-Royal at La Chapelle-en-Serval near Chantilly (Oise). After having rejected a project in the Anglo-Norman style by the architect René Sergent, then a first project in a medieval style (drawings in the collection of the Musée d'Orsay), Halphen decided on the second design, by Guillaume Tronchet : a château in the Louis XVI style celebrating hunting on the exterior and music in the interior. Built from 1907 to 1911, the building (now a hotel) was a great architectural success. Head architect of civil buildings and national palaces, in 1929 Tronchet was entrusted with the construction (in only 8 months) of a new building for the ministry of employment on place de Fontenoy in the 7th arrondissement of Paris by the minister of employment Louis Loucheur. He used the most modern materials and techniques and famous decorative artists, such as frères Martel for the sculpture and Jacques Grüber for the glass windows.

Tronchet died in Nice in February 1959. His memory is perpetuated today by a foundation and, during the annual ceremony of the Académie des Beaux-Arts under the coupole of the Institut de France, this awards a prize to encourage a young artist (usually an architect).

== Main works ==
- Château Mont-Royal, La Chapelle-en-Serval (Oise) (1907–1911)
- Théâtre Ducourneau, Agen (Lot-et-Garonne) (1908) : one of the first buildings in France to be constructed in ciment armé, beneath a strictly neo-classical envelope. The use of cement allowed the installation of balconies with blind-doors.
- Port-Aviation (Juvisy Airport), Viry-Châtillon (Essonne) (1908) : the world's first airport
- Central post-office of Bar-le-Duc (Meuse) (1928)
- Ministry of Work, place de Fontenoy, Paris (VII arrondissement) (1929)
- Hôtel des Postes Thiers, Nice, (Alpes-Maritimes) (1931) : brick building, legend has it recycling plans which had originally been intended for Lille.
- Théâtre Georges Leygues de Villeneuve-sur-Lot (Lot-et-Garonne), in collaboration with Gaston Rapin (1935)
- Lycée Nicéphore Niepce, Chalon-sur-Saône (Saône-et-Loire)
