= La Chapelle-en-Serval =

- Commune
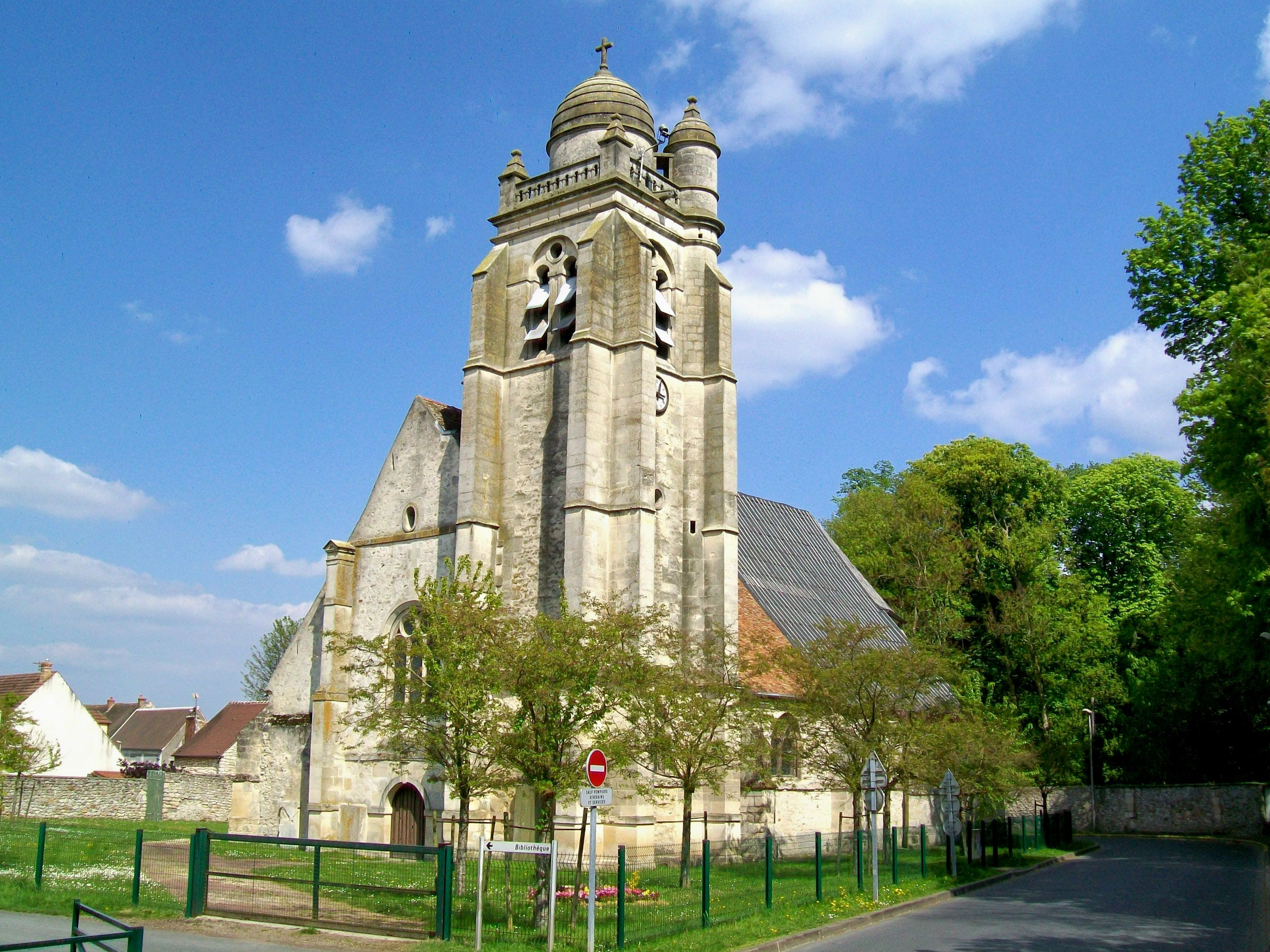
- The church in La Chapelle-en-Serval
- Location of La Chapelle-en-Serval
- Location within France Location within Hauts-de-France
- Coordinates: 49°07′42″N 2°32′07″E
- Country: France
- Region: Hauts-de-France
- Department: Oise
- Arrondissement: Senlis
- Canton: Senlis

Government
  - Mayor (2020–2026): Daniel Dray
- Area^{1}: 10.81 km^{2} (4.17 sq mi)
- Elevation: 73 m (240 ft)
- Highest elevation: 136 m (446 ft)
- Lowest elevation: 57 m (187 ft)
- Population (2023): 3,084
  - Density: 285.3/km^{2} (738.9/sq mi)
- Time zone: UTC+01:00 (CET)
  - Summer (DST): UTC+02:00 (CEST)
- INSEE/Postal code: 60142 /60520
- ^{1} French Land Register data, which excludes lakes, ponds, glaciers > 1 km^{2} (0.386 sq mi or 247 acres) and river estuaries.

La Chapelle-en-Serval is a commune in the Oise department in the Hauts-de-France region in Northern France. The commune is located on the departmental border with Val-d'Oise, which is also the regional border with Île-de-France, southeast of Chantilly.

== Population ==
Historical population
Year	Pop.	±% p.a.
1968	896	—
1975	812	−1.40%
1982	1,385	+7.93%
1990	2,185	+5.86%
1999	2,462	+1.34%
2007	2,570	+0.54%
2012	2,946	+2.77%
2017	3,141	+1.29%
2023	3,084	−0.30%
Source: INSEE

== See also ==
- Communes of the Oise department
