= Haute Banque =

19C private banking network

Haute Banque refers to the network of private bankers which dominated international finance during much of the 19th century, exemplified by the Rothschild family and including numerous other European banking families. Its influence declined in the late 19th and early 20th centuries as it became marginalized by the rise of universal banks and central banks.

The expression is particularly associated with 19th-century Parisian banking networks, many of whose members were Protestant or Jewish. This use is not exclusive, however, and "Haute Banque" has been used to describe the age of European private banking hegemony more broadly.

== History ==
The Haute Banque emerged in the 18th century from the rise of long-distance commerce, in which the merchant bankers provided payment and credit services to other (non-banker) merchants. All Haute Banque houses engages in arbitrage between the respective markets for gold and silver under the bimetallism regime that prevailed in France until the 1870s. In the second half of the 19th century, the Haute Banque was increasingly challenged by joint-stock banks with wholly different deposit-based funding less dependent on the markets for precious metals.

== Examples ==
Cases of Haute Banque in Paris include the following families and individuals:

- Mallet family bank, started in 1713 by Isaac Mallet (1684–1779) and later continued as Banque Mallet
- Delessert family bank, started in 1777 by Étienne Delessert (1735–1816) and continued by his son Benjamin Delessert (1773–1847)
- Fould family bank started by Jacob Fould (1736–1830), continued by prominent financiers Benoît Fould (1792–1858), Achille Fould (1800–1867), and Adolphe-Ernest Fould (1824–1875)
- Rougemont family bank developed from 1780 by Denis de Rougemont de Löwenberg (1759–1839)
- Hottinguer family bank started in 1784 by Jean-Conrad Hottinguer (1764–1841)
- Davillier family bank started in the late 18C by Jean Charles Joachim Davillier (1758–1846), a cofounder of the Caisse d'Épargne et de Prévoyance de Paris
- Perier family bank started in 1794 by Claude Perier (1742–1801), a cofounder of the Bank of France
- Odier family bank started by Antoine Odier (1766–1853)
- Seillière family bank, originating during the Napoleonic Wars from the military supplies business of Florentin Seillière (1744–1825)
- André, then Neuflize family bank, started in 1808 by Dominique André (1766–1844)
- Pillet-Will family bank, started in 1809 by Michel-Frédéric Pillet-Will (1781–1860)
- French affiliate of the Swiss Hentsch family bank, started in 1812 by Henri Hentsch (1761–1835)
- Ardoin family bank started in 1814 by Jacques Ardoin (1779–1854)
- Vernes family bank, started in 1821 by Charles Vernes (1786–1858)
- d'Eichthal family bank, started by Louis d'Eichthal during the Bourbon Restoration
- later bank creations by Adolphe de Waru in 1826, Edward Charles Blount in 1831, Antoine Jacob Stern in 1832, Léopold Koenigswarter in 1834, Paul Lehideux in 1836, Louis-Raphaël Bischoffsheim in 1848, Meyer Cahen d’Anvers in 1849, Armand Donon in 1851, Simon Lazard in 1858, and Frédéric Émile d'Erlanger in 1859.

== See also ==
- Private equity
- History of banking
