= Fould family =

French Jewish family

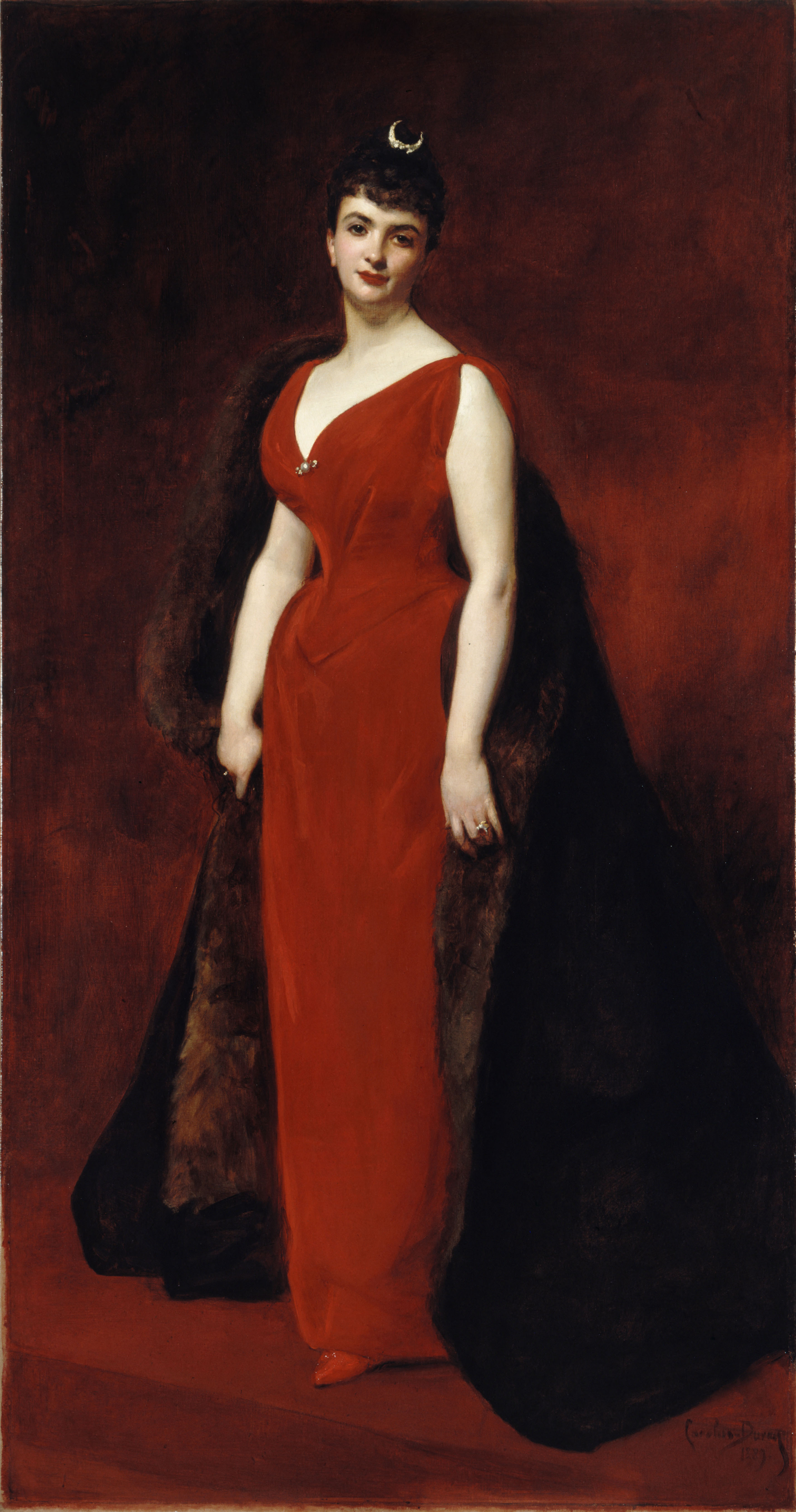
Marguerite Fould, wife of Edgard Stern, painted in 1889.

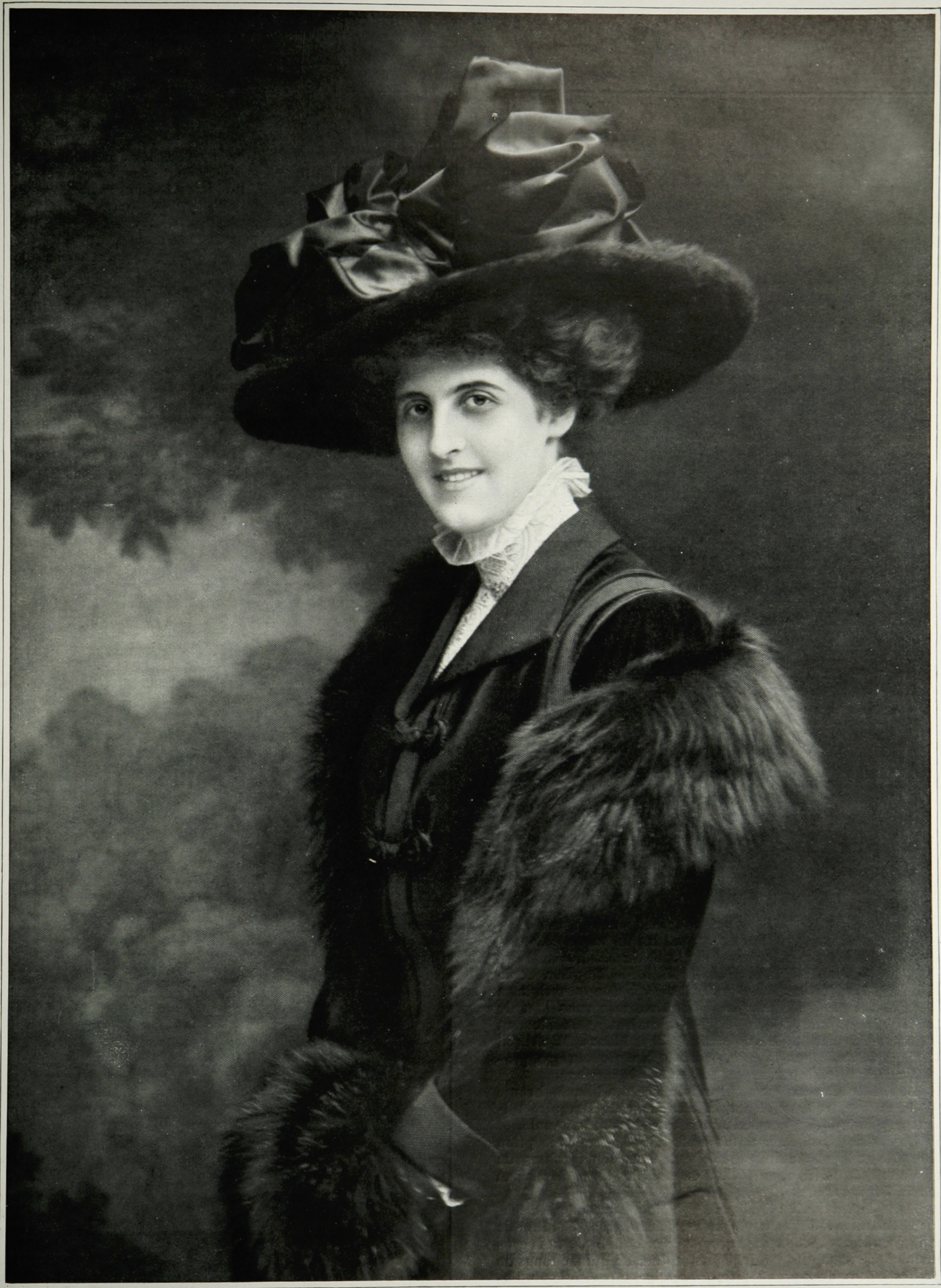
Noémie de Rothschild, née Halphen, in 1909

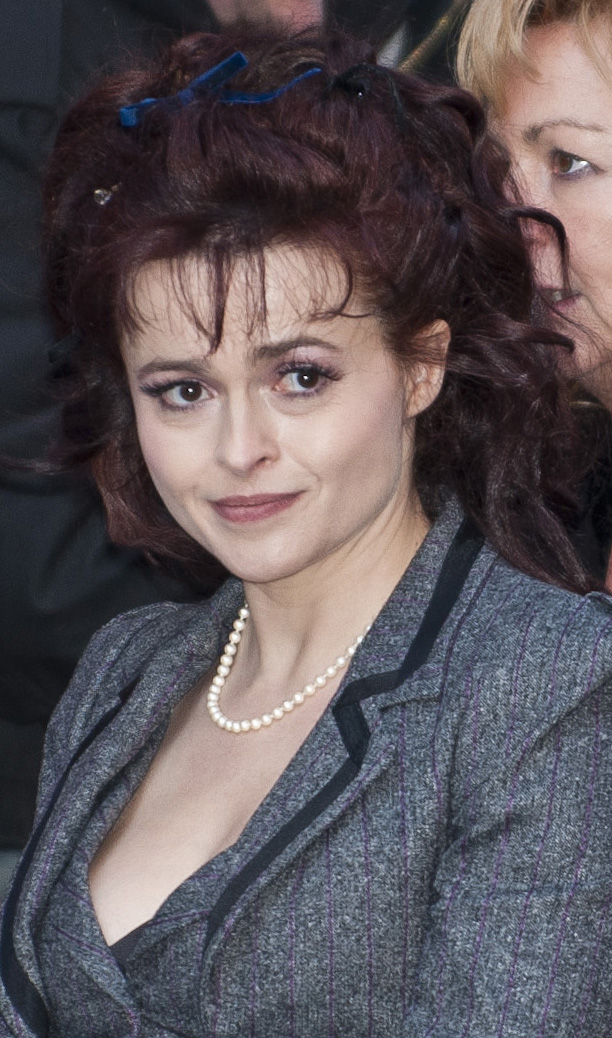
Helena Bonham Carter in 2011

The Fould family (English: /fuːld/ FOOLD, French: [fuld]) is a family of French Jewish descent known for success in banking. It was founded by Beer Léon Fould, a wine-dealer's son from Lorraine, who moved to Paris in 1784 to establish a banking business. The name comes from the Hessian city of Fulda.

== Family tree ==
- Jacob Fould (1736–1830), wine dealer
  - Beer Léon Fould (1767–1855), banker, married to Charlotte Brulhen (1766–1818)
    - Rose Fould Furtado (1791–1870), married to Élie Furtado, the son of the rabbi of Bayonne and the nephew of Abraham Furtado
      - Cécile Charlotte Furtado-Heine (1821–1896), philanthropist and wife of Frankfurt banker Charles Heine
    - Benoît Fould (1792–1858), banker and art collector, married to Helena Oppenheim, daughter of Salomon Oppenheim (1772–1828), banker
    - Louis Fould (1794–1858), banker, married to Adèle Brull (1809–1839)
      - Édouard Fould (1834–1881), politician, mayor of Lurcy-Lévis
    - Achille Fould (1800–1867), banker and statesman, married to Henriette Goldschmidt
      - Adolphe-Ernest Fould (1824–1875), banker and politician
        - Charles Armand Achille-Fould (1861–1926), politician, conseiller général des Hautes-Pyrénées, married to Marie-Louise Heine, daughter of Armand Heine (1818–1883), banker
          - Armand Achille-Fould (1890–1969), politician
            - Aymar Achille-Fould (1925–1986), politician
              - Régine Achille-Fould (1948–), film director
      - Gustave-Eugène Fould (1836–1884), banker and politician, married to Valérie Simonin (1831–1919), actress, novelist and sculptor; she later marries Prince George Ştirbey of Wallachia (1828–1925) who adopts her daughters by Fould :
        - Consuelo Fould (1862–1927), painter
        - Georges Achille-Fould (1868–1951), painter
  - Abraham Fould (1774–1842)
    - Emile Fould (1803–1880), notary
      - Paul Fould (1837–1917), married to Eve Mathilde de Günzburg (1844–1894), daughter of Joseph Günzburg (1812–1878), banker
      - Juliette Fould (1839–1912), married to Eugène Pereire (1831–1908), financier
        - Alice Pereire (1858–1931), married to Salomon Halfon (1854–1923, son of Michael Halfon and Rebecca de Camondo), banker
        - Marie Pereire (1860–1936), married to Jules Halphen (1856–1928), son of Eugène Halphen
          - Henri Isaac Halphen (1886–1962), married to Violet Crosbie (1890–?)
          - Noémie Halphen (1888–1968), married to Maurice de Rothschild (1881–1957)
      - Alphonse Fould (1850–1913), married to Ernestine DuPont
        - Hélène Fould (1878–1927), married to Paul Helbronner (1871–1938), topographer
    - Eugène Fould (1806–?)
      - Henri Jules Fould (1837–1895), married to Suzette Stern (1845–)
        - Marguerite Fould (1866–1956), wife of Edgard Stern (1854–1936)
          - See Stern family
      - Léon Fould (1839–1924), married to Thérèse Ephrussi (1851–1911), sister of Maurice Ephrussi (1849–1916), banker
        - Eugène Fould-Springer (1876–1929), married to Marie-Cecile Springer, daughter of Baron Gustav Springer, industrial magnate
          - Hélène Fould-Springer (1907–1997), married to Eduardo Propper de Callejón (1895–1972), Spanish diplomat
            - Felipe Propper de Callejón (1930–2024), married to Renata, née Goldschmidt
              - Philip Propper de Callejón, financier, married to Grace Byers
                - Jennifer Propper
                - Katherine Propper (1993–), film director and screenwriter
                - Lincoln James Propper
              - Diana Propper de Callejón, financier, married to Antonia Bowring, coach and author
                - Alessandro Propper-Bowring
                - Luca Propper-Bowring
            - Elena Propper de Callejón (1943–), married to Raymond Bonham Carter (1929–2004), British banker
              - Edward Henry Bonham Carter (1960—), financier, married to Victoria Studd, former presenter
                - Harry Bonham Carter (1996—)
                - Maud Bonham Carter (1999—)
                - Tobias Bonham Carter (2004—)
              - Thomas David Bonham Carter (1961—), married to Virginia Bonham Carter
              - Helena Bonham Carter (1966–), actress
                - Billy Raymond Burton (2003–)
                - Nell Burton (2007–)
          - Therese Fould-Springer (1914—1953), married to Alan Payan Pryce-Jones (1908—2000), British author and politician
            - David Pryce-Jones (1936–2025), author
          - Liliane Fould-Springer (1916–2003), married to Élie de Rothschild (1917–2007), banker and vineyard owner
            - Michel Nathaniel Robert Eugène de Rothschild (1946–), financier, married to Nili de Rothschild (née Limon) (1951–)
              - Raphael Benjamin Jacob de Rothschild (1976–2000)
              - Esther Eva de Rothschild (1979–)
