= David Pryce-Jones =

British conservative writer (1936–2025)

David Pryce-Jones FRSL
- Born: 15 February 1936; Vienna, Austria
- Died: 17 November 2025 (aged 89); London, England
- Education: Eton College
- Alma mater: Magdalen College, Oxford
- Occupations: Author; commentator
- Spouse: Clarissa Caccia (m. 1959)
- Children: 4
- Father: Alan Payan Pryce-Jones
- Relatives: David Shukman (son-in-law)

David Eugene Henry Pryce-Jones FRSL (15 February 1936 – 17 November 2025) was a British conservative author, historian and political commentator.

== Early life ==
Pryce-Jones was born in Meidling, Vienna, Austria, on 15 February 1936. He was educated at Eton and earned a degree in history at Magdalen College, Oxford. While at Oxford in 1957, he was runner-up for the Newdigate Prize.

He was the son of writer Alan Payan Pryce-Jones (1908–2000) by his first wife (married 1934), Therese "Poppy" Fould-Springer (1914–1953) of the Fould family. Therese was a daughter of Baron Eugène Fould-Springer, a French-born banker who was a cousin of Achille Fould, and Marie-Cecile or Mitzi Springer, later Mrs Frank Wooster or Mary Wooster, whose father was the industrialist Baron Gustav Springer (1842–1920), son of Baron Max Springer. She also had a brother, Baron Max Fould-Springer (1906–1999), and two sisters Helene Propper de Callejón (1907–1997), wife of Spanish diplomat Eduardo Propper de Callejón and grandmother of actress Helena Bonham Carter, and Baroness Liliane de Rothschild (1916–2003).

His parents married in 1934 in Vienna, where Pryce-Jones was born at his grandfather's home. His mother's Jewish background made it unwise to remain in Vienna and the family moved to England at the end of 1937. In 1940, a four-year-old Pryce-Jones was stranded with his nanny in Dieppe, Normandy, and was rescued from the invading German army by his mother's brother-in-law Eduardo Propper de Callejón. He acknowledged his uncle-by-marriage's efforts in saving his own life when Propper de Callejón retired from Spanish diplomatic service. He was reunited with his parents in England in 1941.

Pryce-Jones was a first cousin of Elena Propper de Callejón, wife of late banker Raymond Bonham Carter and mother of actress Helena Bonham Carter. Another cousin is Baron Nathaniel de Rothschild, only son of the better known Baron Élie de Rothschild.

== Career ==
Pryce-Jones did his National Service in the Coldstream Guards, in which he was commissioned in 1955, promoted lieutenant in 1956, and served in the British Army of the Rhine. In 1956, Pryce-Jones lectured the men under his command about the necessity of the Suez War, but admits that he did not believe what he was saying. At the time, he believed that the Islamic world would soon progress after decolonization, and was disappointed when this did not happen. He has worked as a journalist and author. He was literary editor at the Financial Times 1959–61, and The Spectator from 1961 to 1963.

Pryce-Jones was a senior editor at National Review magazine. He also contributed to The New Criterion and Commentary, and for Benador Associates. He often wrote about the contemporary events and the history of the Middle East, Eastern Europe, and intelligence matters.

In his 1989 book The Closed Circle, Pryce-Jones examined what he considered to be the reasons for the backward state of the Arab world. A review described the book as more of an "indictment" than an examination of the Arab world. In Pryce-Jones's opinion, the root cause of Arab backwardness is the tribal nature of Arab political life, which reduces all politics to war of rival families struggling mercilessly for power. As such, Pryce-Jones's view is that power in Arab politics consists of a network of client–patron relations between powerful and less powerful families and clans. Pryce-Jones considers as an additional retarding factor in Arab society the influence of Islam, which hinders efforts to build a Western style society where the family and clan are not the dominant political unit. Pryce-Jones argues that Islamic fundamentalism is a means of attempting to mobilize the masses behind the dominant clans.

In his book, Betrayal: France, the Arabs, and the Jews, he has accused the French government of being anti-Semitic and pro-Arab, and of consistently siding against Israel in the hope of winning the favour of the Islamic world. The book's premise has been likened to Bat Ye'or's Eurabia theory, which has been praised by Pryce-Jones as "prophetic". The American diplomat Philip H. Gordon gave a highly unfavorable review of Betrayal in Foreign Affairs, describing the book as a French-bashing "polemic" disguised as a work of history. Gordon accused Pryce-Jones of hypocrisy, noting that he took successive French governments to task for supporting Middle Eastern dictators like President Saddam Hussein of Iraq while failing to note that both the United States and the United Kingdom have also supported Middle Eastern dictators. Gordon wrote that Pryce-Jones's claim that French President Jacques Chirac was guilty of "perfidy" towards the West by opposing the Iraq War in 2003 was unfair, writing in 2007 that much of what happened in Iraq since 2003 appeared to justify Chirac's predictions of a debacle if the United States invaded.

Pryce-Jones wrote a biography, Evelyn Waugh and His World (1973). It was rather notorious for digging up conflict among the married Mitford siblings, with Pamela accusing Jessica of revealing private correspondence concerning their sister the Duchess of Devonshire. The 1976 biography Unity Mitford: A Quest followed, despite alleged efforts by some of Unity Mitford's sisters to prevent Pryce-Jones from doing his research and publishing the book.

He was elected a Fellow of the Royal Society of Literature in 1980.

== Personal life and death ==
Pryce-Jones married Clarissa Caccia, daughter of diplomat Harold Caccia, Baron Caccia, in 1959. They had three surviving children (one deceased, Sonia: 1970–1972), Jessica, Candida and Adam, and lived in London. Jessica is married to the BBC journalist David Shukman.

He gave a comprehensive recorded interview about his life – his childhood escape from the Nazis, his friendships with Isaac Bashevis Singer, Arthur Koestler, Stalin’s daughter Svetlana, John Gross and others, in conversation with his friend Tom Gross during the Covid-19 lockdown.

Pryce-Jones died at home from kidney failure on 17 November 2025, at the age of 89.

== Bibliography ==
=== Novels ===
- Owls & Satyrs (1961)
- The Sands of Summer (1963)
- Quondam (1965)
- The Stranger’s View (1967)
- Running Away (1971)
- The England Commune (1975)
- Shirley’s Guild (1979)
- The Afternoon Sun (1986)
- Inheritance (1992)
- Safe Houses (2007)

=== Non-fiction ===
- Graham Greene (1963)
- Next Generation: Travels in Israel (1965)
- The Hungarian Revolution (1969)
- The Face of Defeat (1972)
- Evelyn Waugh & his world (1973)
- Unity Mitford (1976)
- Vienna (1978)
- Paris in the Third Reich (1981)
- Cyril Connolly: Journal & Memoir (1983) ISBN 0-00-216546-5
- The Closed Circle (1989)
- You Can't be Too Careful (1992)
- The War that Never Was: The Fall of the Soviet Empire 1985–1991 (1995) ISBN 0-297-81320-X
- The Strange Death of the Soviet Empire (1995) ISBN 0-8050-4154-0
- A Very Elegant Coup, (2003), a review of the book All the Shah's Men
- Betrayal: France, the Arabs, and the Jews (2006) ISBN 1-59403-151-7
- Treason of the Heart. From Thomas Paine to Kim Philby (2011) Encounter Books, ISBN 1-5940-3528-8
- Fault Lines (2015)
- Signatures: Literary Encounters of a Lifetime (Encounter Books, 2020)

== Sources ==
- Ellen Doon. "Alan Pryce-Jones Papers", Yale, New Haven, Connecticut. May 2003. This also lists some of David Pryce-Jones's British aristocratic connections at the end. Retrieved 28 February 2008.
- Jenni Frazer. "How Helena’s grandfather was finally recognised as a true hero" The Jewish Chronicle 8 February 2008, narrating how Eduardo Propper de Callejón was recognized as "Righteous Among Nations" recently. Retrieved 28 February 2008.
- Eric Pace. Alan Pryce-Jones, 91, Editor And Eminent Man of Letters" (obituary). The New York Times, 2 February 2000. Retrieved 28 February 2008. For Pryce-Jones's ancestry
- Anne Yamey. (May 2003?). Springer and Fould-Springer families of Ansbach. Retrieved 28 February 2008.
- Gellner, Ernest "Up From Imperialism" pp. 34–36 from The New Republic, Volume 200, Number 21, Issue #3, 879, 22 May 1989.
- Gordon, Philip (May 2007). "Review of Betrayal: France, the Arabs, and the Jews by David Pryce-Jones". Foreign Affairs. 86 (3): 148–149.
