= Cécile Furtado-Heine =

French philanthropist (1821–1896)

Cécile Charlotte Furtado-Heine
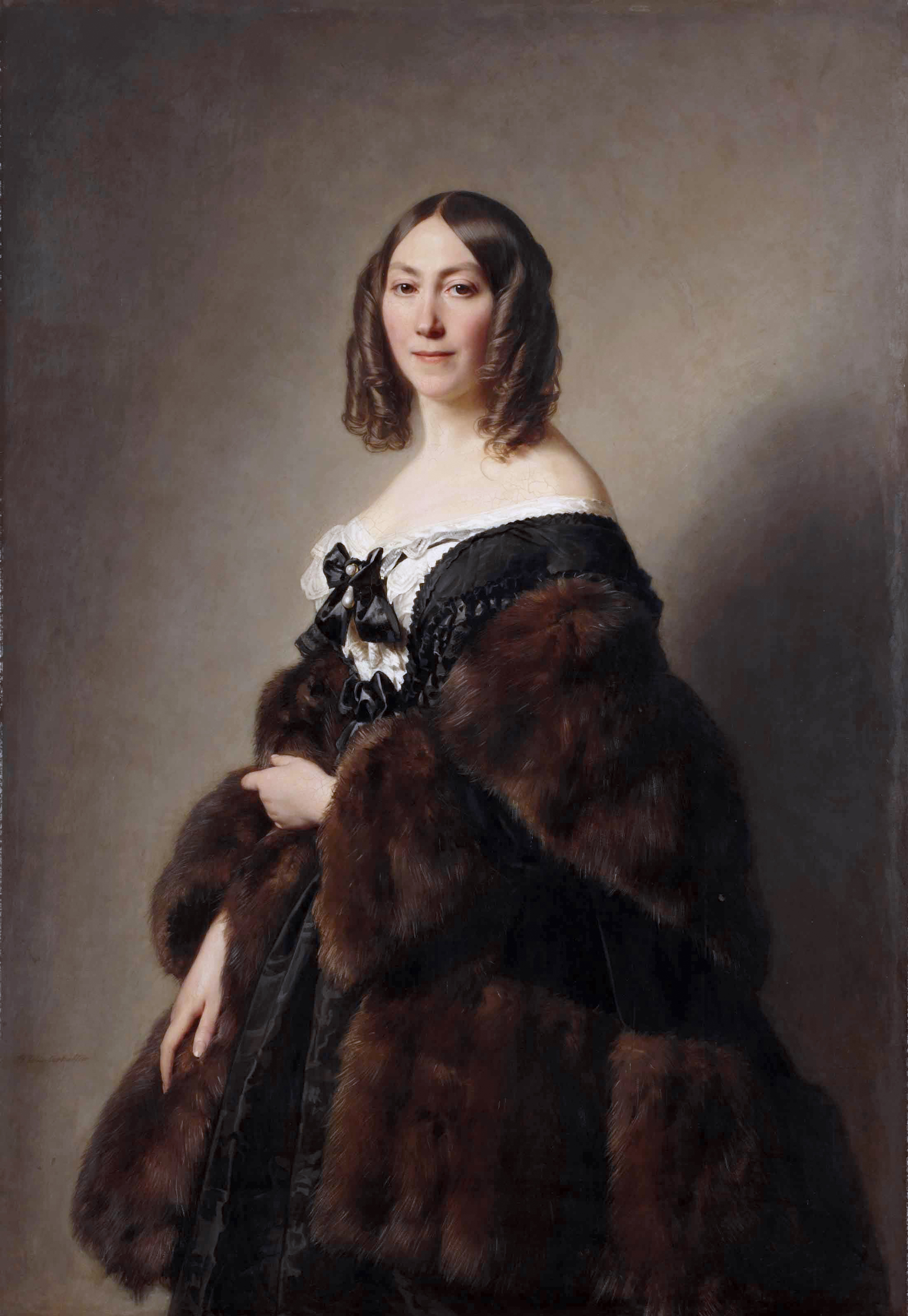
- Born: Cécile Charlotte Furtado; March 6, 1821; Paris, France
- Died: December 10, 1896 (aged 75)
- Occupation: Philanthropist

Cécile Furtado-Heine, born Cécile Charlotte Furtado, was a French philanthropist. She was born in Paris on March 6, 1821, and died on December 10, 1896.

== Early life ==
Cécile Furtado was born in Paris on March 6, 1821, to a Jewish family of Sephardic (Spanish-Portuguese) ancestry.

Cecile's father, Élie Furtado, was the eldest son of Joseph Furtado, a financier and shipowner from Bayonne and the nephew of Abraham Furtado. Elie Furtado was a banker in Paris and the representative of Bayonne's constituency at Paris' central consistory. His uncle, Abraham Furtado served as secretary to Napoleon Bonaparte's "Grand Sanhedrin".

Cecile's mother Rose Fould was the daughter of Beer Léon Fould, banker and mayor of Rocquencourt, near Versailles. Her maternal uncle, Achille Fould, was French Finance minister under Napoleon III.

== Personal life ==
Cécile was married on October 2, 1838, in Rocquencourt to the rich Frankfurt banker Charles Heine (1810 Hamburg - 1865 Luchon), the son of Salomon Heine and cousin of the German poet Heinrich Heine and the banker Michel Heine.

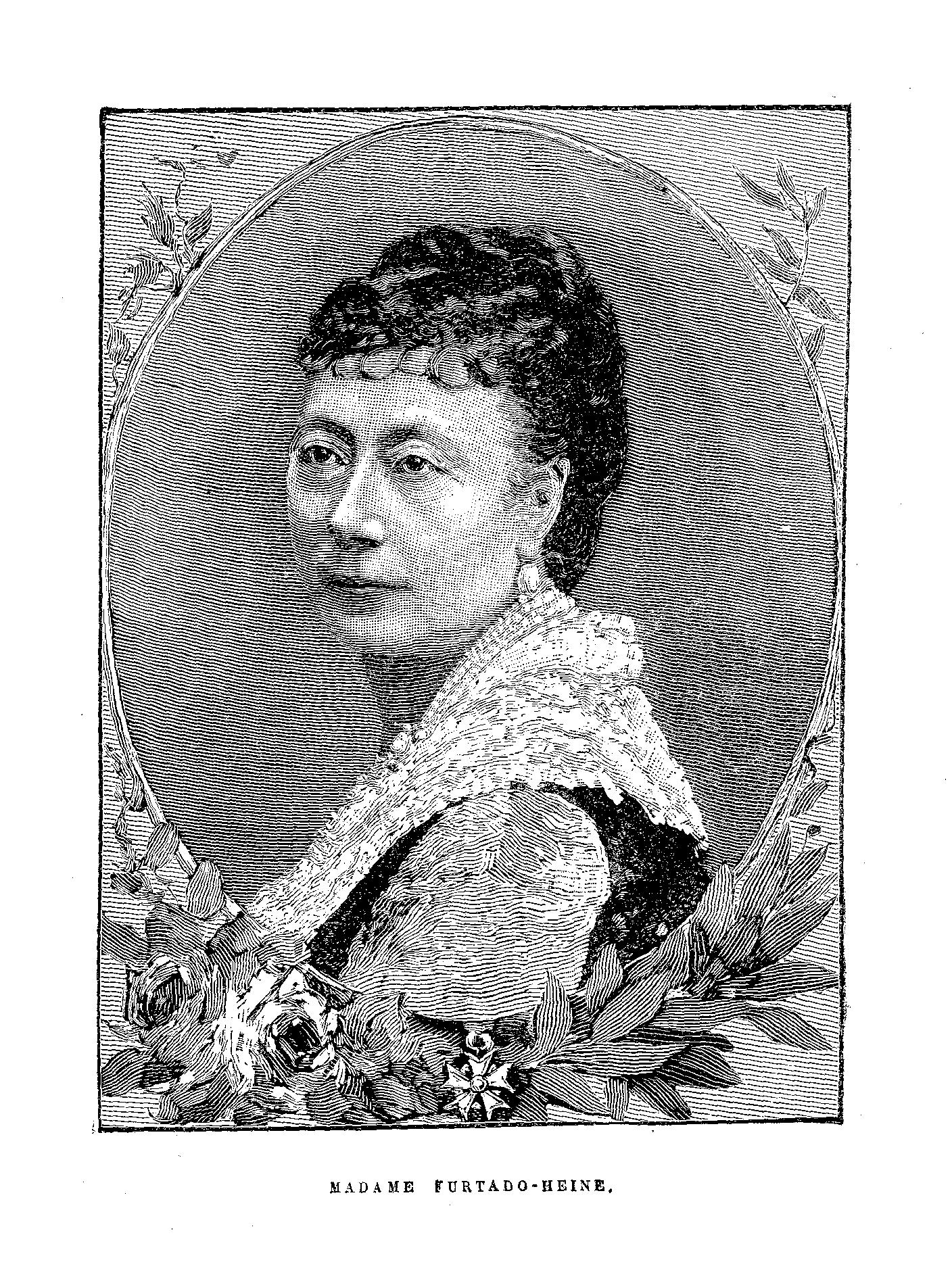
Cécile Furtado-Heine, engraving extracted from Nos grandes Françaises (Our great Frenchmen), (1905)

Widowed on July 4, 1865, at age 44, she inherited a considerable fortune. In Paris, she lived in a large mansion in the middle of a huge garden, at 28 rue de Monceau. Having no children, she adopted an orphan, Marguerite Laure Juliette dite ''Paule'' (1847 - 1903), who was possibly the biological daughter of Cécile's brother Paul Furtado-Fould and his mistress Marie-Julie Morel. Marguerite Paule married Michel-Aloys Ney, Duke of Elchingen in 1866, and later married Victor Masséna, Duke of Rivoli in 1882.

== Volunteer work ==
During the war of 1870, Cécile supported the Red Cross and organized an ambulance service for the repatriation of the wounded. In 1884, she created an annuity for a children's hospice in the 14th Arrondissement. The street where this establishment is located has been called Furtado-Heine Street since 1897. She financed other establishments, including a nursery school in the city of Bayonne and a nursery in Montrouge.

In 1895, at the return of the French expeditionary force of Madagascar, Cécile sought to relieve the fate of the sick soldiers. She bequeathed to the army her villa in Nice on the Promenade des Anglais as a convalescent home for officers; today that building is known as Villa Furtado-Heine. She was also responsible for the cost of maintaining the sick, the staff, and the building. She was also very generous to the Pasteur Institute. A bust representing her still adorns the hall of the institute.

Cécile Furtado-Heine did not forget her co-religionists. She supported several Jewish charities and contributed to the construction of new synagogues in France and Belgium. The most beautiful of these synagogues is without doubt that of Versailles where two plates of red marble pay homage to her. She also underwrote the cost of stained glass windows at the Saint-Germain church of Grand-Chesnay on which Rocquencourt depends; they represent a Saint Cecilia and a Saint Napoleon. Her charitable activities and generosity earned her the rank of Officer of the Legion of Honor (Légion d'honneur) in 1896. At that time, it was still very rare for a woman to attain such an honor.

A few weeks after this appointment, Cécile Furtado-Heine died on December 10, 1896, in her castle Rocquencourt. Her death was marked by a public mourning which is associated with the President of the Republic, Felix Faure, ministers and the municipality of Paris. Zadoc Kahn, the chief rabbi of France, gave the eulogy at her funeral.

=== Sources ===
- AFMEG
- Généalogie Heine

=== Bibliography ===
- Richard Ayoun, « Une femme philanthrope : Madame Cécile Furtado-Heine (1821-1896) », dans Centenaire de la Synagogue de Versailles, Versailles, 1986, p. 16-23.
- Lucienne Mazenod (dir.), Les femmes célèbres, Paris, éditions d'art Lucien Mazenod, t. 1, 1960, « Furtado-Heine Cécile », p. 438.
- M. Parcot, « Furtado-Heine Cécile », dans M. Prévost et Roman d'Amat, Dictionnaire de biographie française, Paris, Letouzey et Ané, 1954, 14 : 1458.

=== Related articles ===
- Villa Furtado-Heine
