= Halphen =

Halphen is a surname. Notable people with the surname include:

- Éric Halphen (born 1959), French judge
- Étienne Halphen (1911–1954), French mathematician
- Eugène Halphen (1820–1912), French historian, poet and book editor
- Fernand Halphen (1872–1917), French composer
- Georges Henri Halphen (1844–1889), French mathematician
- Gustav Halphen (1865–1924), Czech businessman in Kolín nad Labem
- Gustave Halphen (d. 1872), French diplomat
- Louis Halphen (1880–1950), French medieval-historian
- Baroness Noémie de Rothschild (1888–1968), born Noémie Halphen, French philanthropist
