= Houston Film Critics Society Awards 2024 =

Annual US film awards ceremony

18th Houston Film Critics Society Awards
- Date: January 14, 2025
- Location: Midtown Arts & Theater Center Houston, Texas
- Presented by: Houston Film Critics Society
- Website: houstonfilmcritics.com

The 18th Houston Film Critics Society Awards were announced on January 14, 2025, at the Midtown Arts & Theater Center Houston (MATCH) in Texas. The nominations were announced on January 7, 2025, with The Brutalist leading the nominations with nine, followed by Conclave with eight, and Anora, Dune: Part Two and Wicked all receiving six each.

Comedy-drama film Anora led the awards with three wins: Best Picture, Best Actress (Mikey Madison), and Best Screenplay (Sean Baker).

The nominees for the Texas Independent Film Award were announced on December 15, 2024.

== Winners and nominees ==
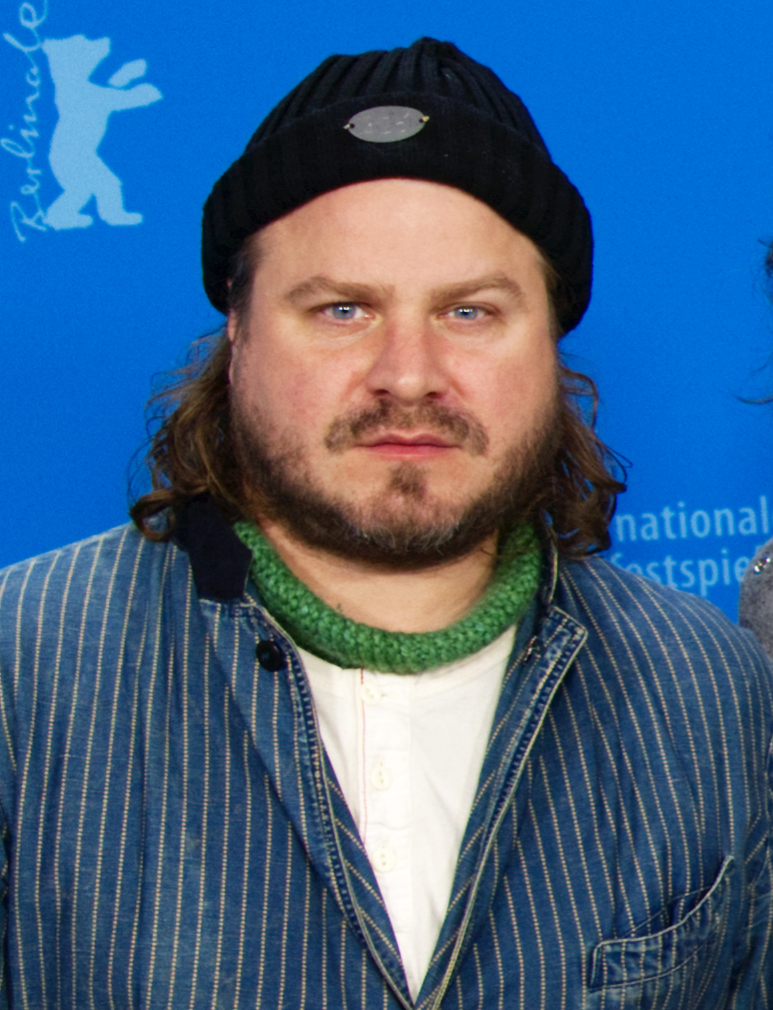
Brady Corbet, Best Director winner

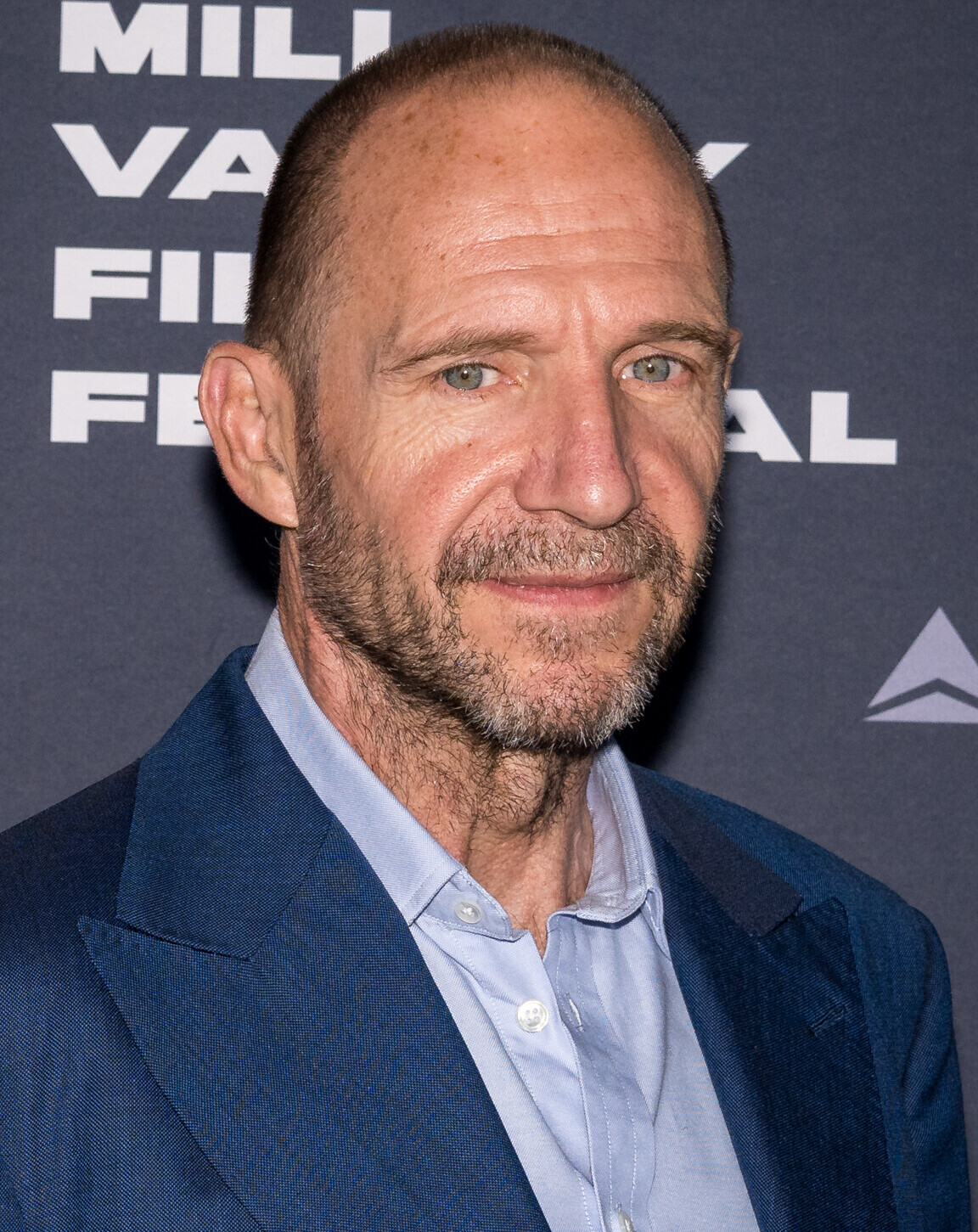
Ralph Fiennes, Best Actor winner

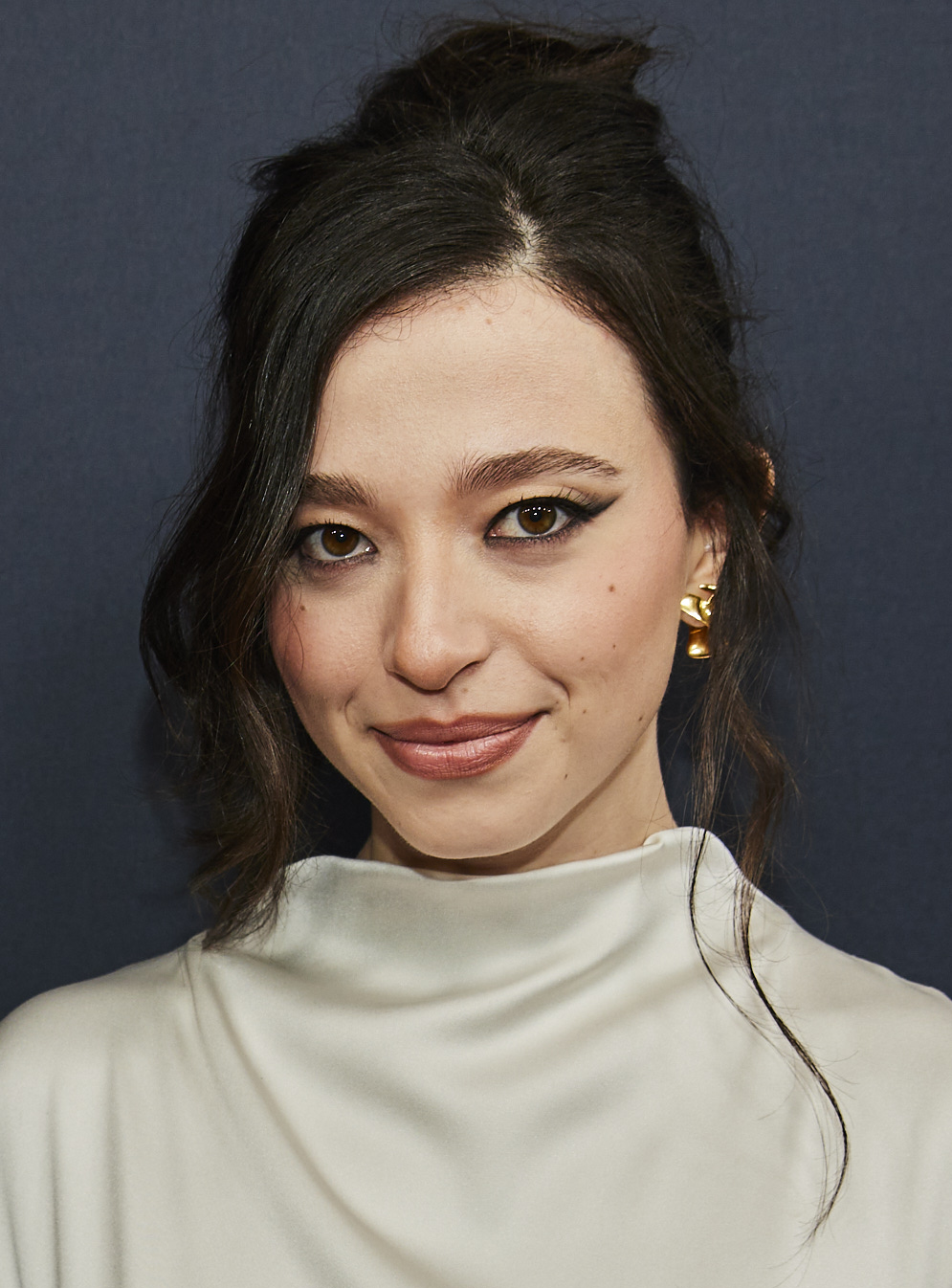
Mikey Madison, Best Actress winner

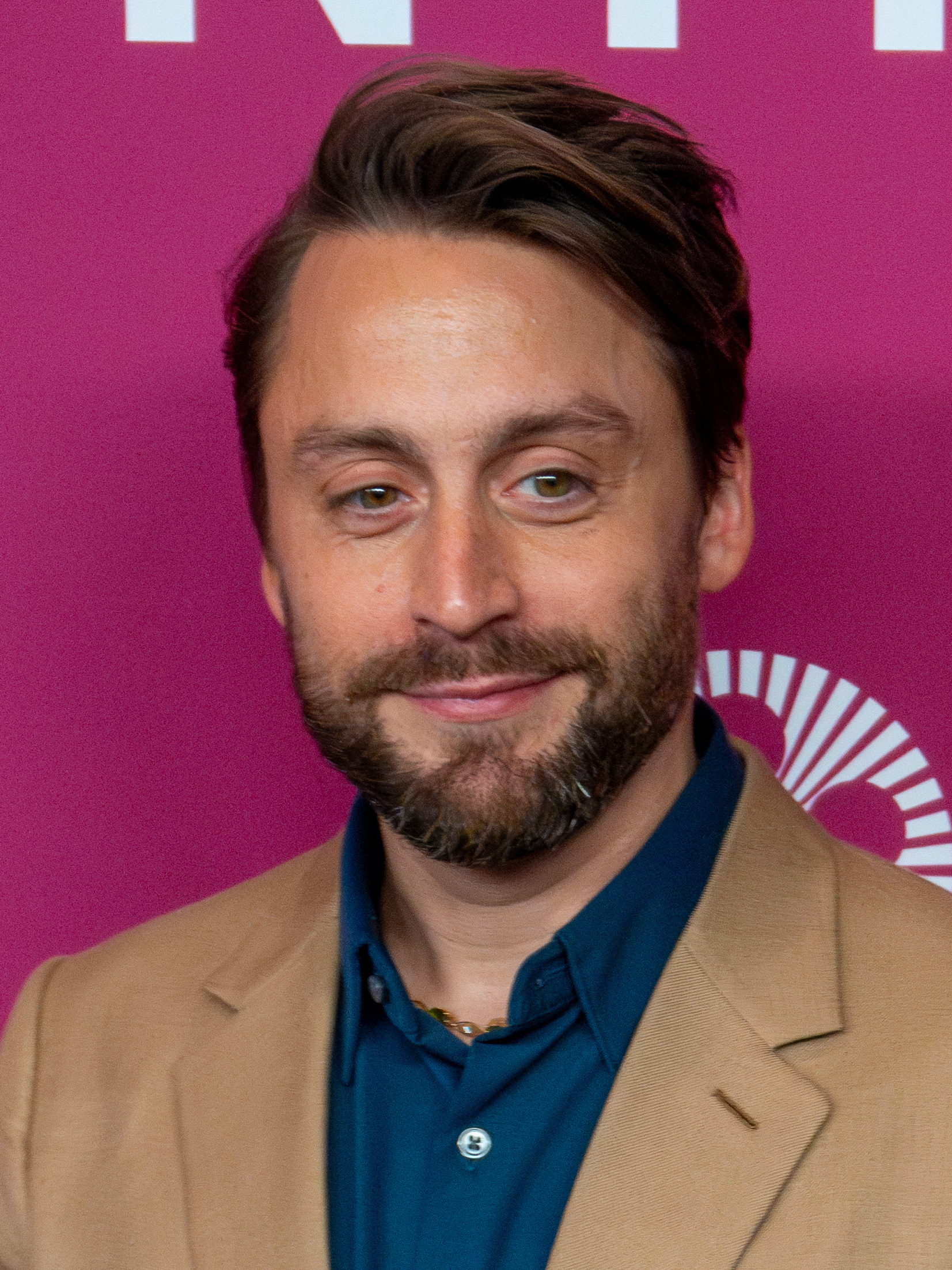
Kieran Culkin, Best Supporting Actor winner

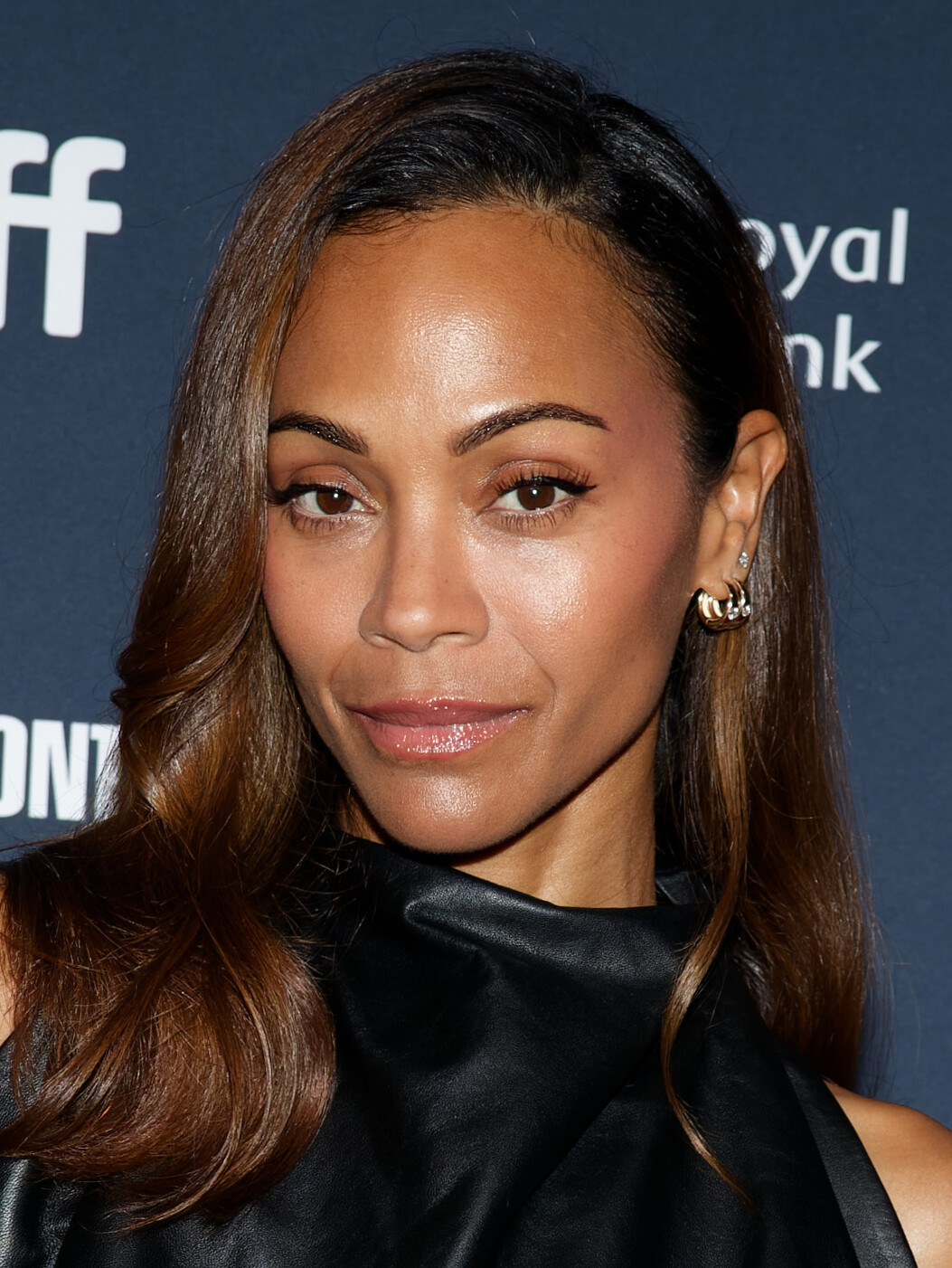
Zoe Saldaña, Best Supporting Actress winner

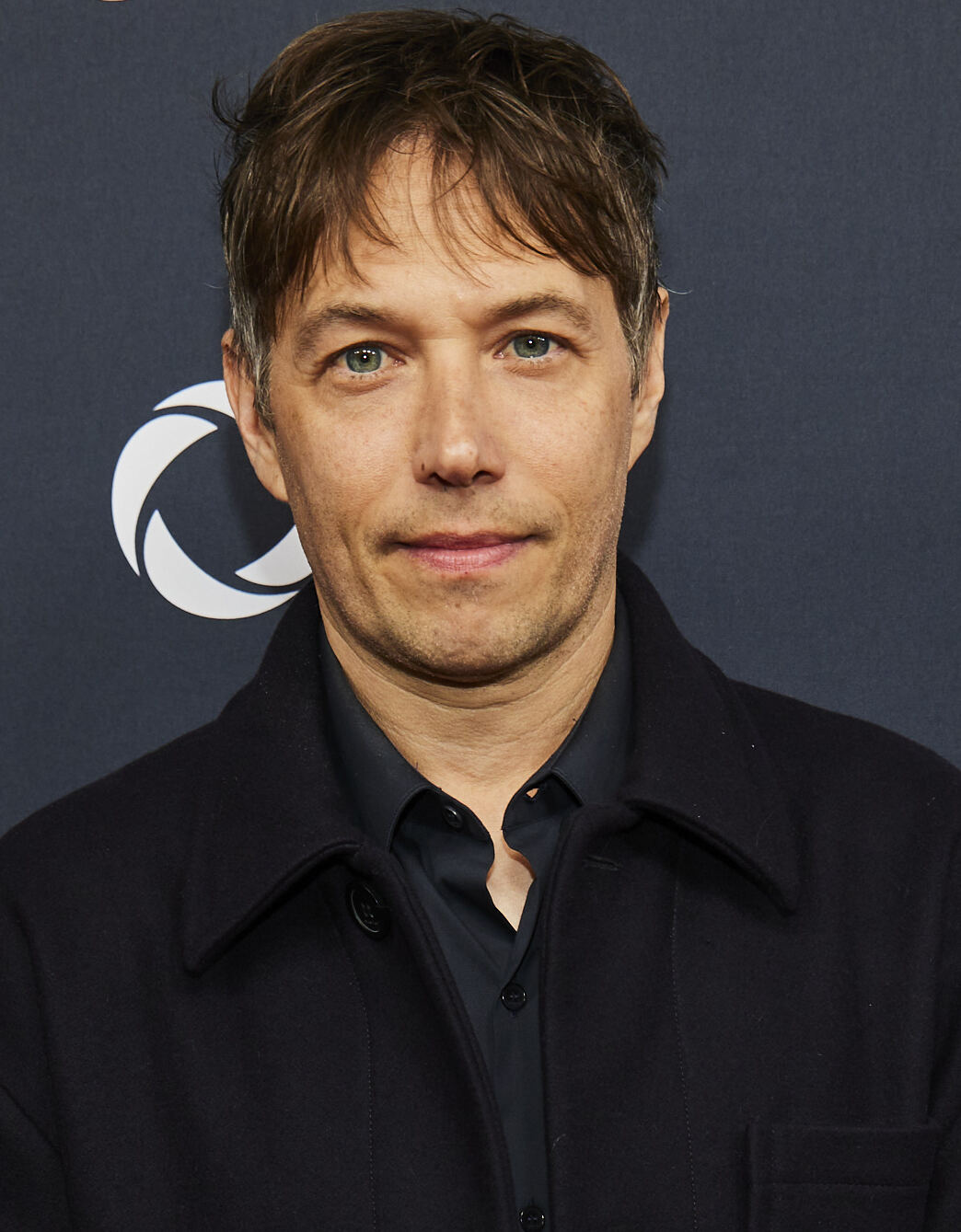
Sean Baker, Best Screenplay winner

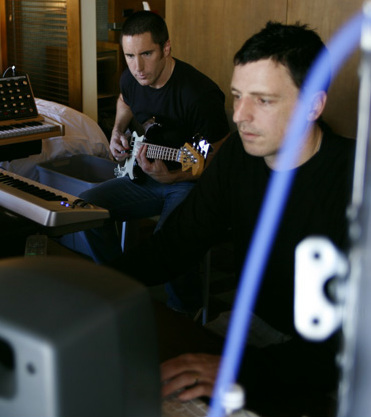
Trent Reznor and Atticus Ross, Best Original Score winners

Winners are listed first and highlighted with boldface.

| Best Picture | Best Director |
|---|---|
| **Anora**; The Brutalist; A Complete Unknown; Conclave; Dune: Part Two; Nickel Boys; A Real Pain; Sing Sing; The Substance; Wicked | **Brady Corbet – The Brutalist**; Sean Baker – Anora; Edward Berger – Conclave; Jon M. Chu – Wicked; Coralie Fargeat – The Substance; Denis Villeneuve – Dune: Part Two |
| Best Actor | Best Actress |
| **Ralph Fiennes – Conclave as Cardinal Thomas Lawrence**; Adrien Brody – The Brutalist as László Tóth; Timothée Chalamet – A Complete Unknown as Bob Dylan; Colman Domingo – Sing Sing as John "Divine G" Whitfield; Hugh Grant – Heretic as Mr. Reed | **Mikey Madison – Anora as Anora "Ani" Mikheeva**; Cynthia Erivo – Wicked as Elphaba Thropp; Marianne Jean-Baptiste – Hard Truths as Pansy Deacon; Angelina Jolie – Maria as Maria Callas; Demi Moore – The Substance as Elisabeth Sparkle |
| Best Supporting Actor | Best Supporting Actress |
| **Kieran Culkin – A Real Pain as Benji Kaplan**; Yura Borisov – Anora as Igor; Edward Norton – A Complete Unknown as Pete Seeger; Guy Pearce – The Brutalist as Harrison Lee Van Buren Sr.; Jeremy Strong – The Apprentice as Roy Cohn | **Zoe Saldaña – Emilia Pérez as Rita Mora Castro**; Ariana Grande – Wicked as Galinda Upland; Felicity Jones – The Brutalist as Erzsébet Tóth; Margaret Qualley – The Substance as Sue; Isabella Rossellini – Conclave as Sister Agnes |
| Best Screenplay | Best Animated Feature |
| **Sean Baker – Anora**; Clint Bentley and Greg Kwedar – Sing Sing; Brady Corbet and Mona Fastvold – The Brutalist; Jesse Eisenberg – A Real Pain; RaMell Ross and Joslyn Barnes – Nickel Boys; Peter Straughan – Conclave | **The Wild Robot**; Flow; Inside Out 2; Memoir of a Snail; Wallace & Gromit: Vengeance Most Fowl |
| Best Documentary Feature | Best Foreign Language Feature |
| **Will & Harper**; Daughters; No Other Land; The Remarkable Life of Ibelin; Sugarcane; Union | **Emilia Pérez**; All We Imagine as Light; I'm Still Here; Kneecap; The Seed of the Sacred Fig |
| Best Original Score | Best Original Song |
| **Trent Reznor and Atticus Ross – Challengers**; Volker Bertelmann – Conclave; Daniel Blumberg – The Brutalist; Kris Bowers – The Wild Robot; Clément Ducol – Emilia Pérez; Hans Zimmer – Dune: Part Two | **"Kiss the Sky" – The Wild Robot**; "Compress / Repress" – Challengers; "El Mal" – Emilia Pérez; "Harper and Will Go West" – Will & Harper; "Like a Bird" – Sing Sing |
| Best Cinematography | Best Visual Effects |
| **Lol Crawley – The Brutalist**; Jarin Blaschke – Nosferatu; Stéphane Fontaine – Conclave; Greig Fraser – Dune: Part Two; Jomo Fray – Nickel Boys | **Dune: Part Two**; Alien: Romulus; Kingdom of the Planet of the Apes; Nosferatu; Twisters; Wicked |
| Best Ensemble Cast | Best Stunt Coordination Team |
| **Conclave**; Anora; The Brutalist; Saturday Night; Sing Sing; Wicked | **The Fall Guy**; Deadpool & Wolverine; Dune: Part Two; Furiosa: A Mad Max Saga; Gladiator II |
Texas Independent Film Award
**Runaway Radio: Mike McGuff revisits the magic created by Houston 101 KLOL**; Deliveries from Eva: Lakisha R. Lemons explores a complex relationship between a forgotten music star and a delivery driver; The Ego Death of Queen Cecilia: Chris Beier follows a former YouTube star trying to find her place in an unfriendly world; Lost Soulz: Katherine Propper tracks a rapper's journey into himself and his music; When Houston Had the Blues: Alan Swyer considers the impact of the city's Black music scene
