= Paul Helbronner =

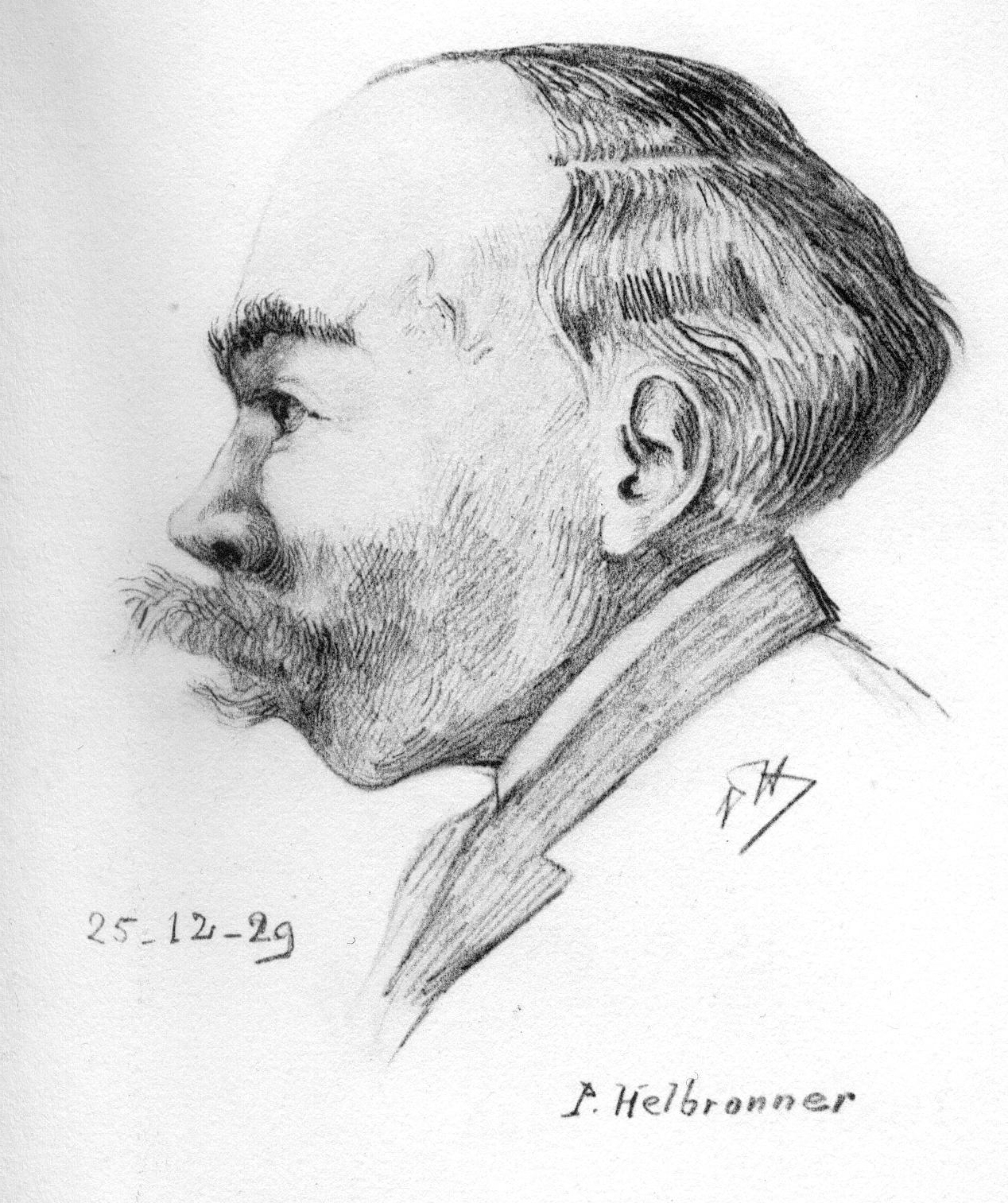
- Drawing of Paul Helbronner, 1929.
- Born: 24 April 1871; Compiègne
- Died: 18 October 1938 (aged 67)
- Education: École polytechnique
- Spouse: Hélène Fould
- Scientific career
- Fields: Topography
- Thesis: Résumé des opérations exécutées jusqu'à la fin de 1911 pour la description géométrique détaillée des Alpes françaises (1912)

Paul Helbronner (24 April 1871 – 18 October 1938) was a French topographer, alpinist and geodesist who pioneered cartography of the French Alps. Pointe Helbronner in the Mont Blanc massif is named in his honor.
