= Eduardo Propper de Callejón =

Spanish diplomat (1895–1972)

- Born: 9 April 1895; Madrid, Spain
- Died: 11 January 1972 (aged 76); London, England
- Occupation: Diplomat
- Known for: Saving the lives of thousands of refugees seeking to escape Nazi terror during World War II
- Spouse: Hélène Roberte Fould-Springer (m. 1929)
- Children: 2
- Relatives: Raymond Bonham Carter (son-in-law); Helena Bonham Carter (granddaughter); Katherine Propper (great-granddaughter)

Eduardo Propper de Callejón (9 April 1895 – 11 January 1972) was a Spanish diplomat who is remembered mainly for having facilitated the escape of thousands of Jews from Occupied France during World War II between 1940 and 1944.

He was the father-in-law of the British banker Raymond Bonham Carter and the maternal grandfather of the British actress Helena Bonham Carter, as well as a great-grandfather of American screenwriter and movie director Katherine Propper.

== Career ==
Propper de Callejón joined the Spanish diplomatic service in June 1918. His initial stations were at embassies in Brussels (1918-1920), Lisbon (1924-1926), Vienna (1926-1930, where he met his wife), and Cairo (1930).

After the proclamation of the Second Spanish Republic in 1931 when King Alfonso XIII fled Spain, Eduardo Propper de Callejón resigned from the Spanish Foreign Service.

Propper stayed in Paris throughout the Spanish Civil War and was chosen in April 1939 to be a Spanish emissary to France before the next war began.

Propper de Callejón was First Secretary of the Spanish Embassy in Paris when France began an armistice with Nazi Germany on 22 June 1940. Five months earlier, to prevent the Wehrmacht from plundering the art collection that his wife's family kept at the Château of Royaumont, he declared the castle to be his main residence in January 1940 so that it would be treated in the same privileged way as the accommodation of any other diplomat. Among the art works thus saved are a triptych of Jan van Eyck (one of Adolf Hitler's favourite painters), and paintings by Renoir, Rembrandt, Gainsborough, Dubuffet and Picasso.

In June 1940, Propper de Callejón issued from the Spanish Consulate in Bordeaux, thousands of transit visas to Jews and others escaping Europe, which allowed these refugees to enter Spain legally to reach Portugal. Propper disobeyed direct orders (needing prior authorization from Madrid) to sign special transit visas, saving thousands of Jewish lives and the lives of many others during WWII. Portuguese Consul Aristides de Sousa Mendes signed transit visas allowing thousands to flee Europe through neutral Portugal, where Lisbon was the crucial port of exit.

After relocating to the new embassy site in Vichy, Propper continued to provide visas to refugees against orders. When Spanish Foreign Minister Ramón Serrano Suñer learnt that Propper de Callejón was issuing visas without prior authorization, he had him demoted and transferred to the Consulate of Larache in the Spanish protectorate in Morocco. Before his departure, General Philippe Pétain himself awarded Propper de Callejón the Cross of the Legion of Honor (Croix Officiel de la Légion d’Honneur) in 1941 for Propper's efforts in finalizing the Franco-German armistice.

In a letter written 14 March 1941 from Suñer to Spain's Ambassador to France José Félix de Lequerica, Suñer describes the French government's award to Propper de Callejón as serving the interests of the French Jewry and the French journalists at the expense of the Spanish Nationalist cause.

Afterwards, Propper de Callejón would be posted to Tangier (1941), Rabat (1941-1945), Zurich (1945-1949), Washington, D.C. (1949-1955), Ottawa (1955-1958), and Oslo (1958-1963), where he served as a member of the Spanish Foreign Service. With his former colleague Ambassador Lequerica, Propper was instrumental in establishing diplomatic relations between the United States and Franco's Spain, resulting in the Pact of Madrid.

== Family ==
Propper de Callejón's father, Maximilian "Max" Propper, was a Bohemian Jew and banker, and his mother, Juana de Callejón Kennedy (of the Kennedy Massicot family), was a Spanish Catholic born in New Orleans and the daughter of the Spanish Consul to the U.S. during the American Civil War, Juan Bartolomé de Callejón Villegas (1816-1890) and Marie Louise Kennedy Massicot. They raised him as well as his two older brothers in the Catholic faith.

He married his wife, Hélène Roberte Fould-Springer, in December 1929 in France. His wife was a socialite and painter. She was from a notable Jewish Franco-Austrian banking family, the daughter of Baron Eugène Fould-Springer (a French banker descended from the Ephrussi family and the Fould dynasty) and Marie Cécile "Mitzi" von Springer (whose father was Austrian-born industrial magnate Baron Gustav von Springer and whose mother was from the de Königswarter family). Hélène's younger sister was the prominent Paris art patron and philanthropist Liliane "Lily" de Rothschild (Baroness Élie de Rothschild, 1916–2003) of the prominent Rothschild family (who had also married within the von Springer family during the 19th century).

The Fould family patriarch, Beer Leon Fould (1767-1855) was said to be the inspiration for the Baron de Nuncingen in Balzac’s Comédie Humaine.

== Personal life ==
Propper de Callejón identified as a devout Catholic. His wife Hélène "Bubbles" Propper de Callejón (née Fould-Springer) converted to Catholicism after WWII. He had two children. His eldest son Felipe Propper de Callejón (1930-2024) made New York City his lifelong residence, becoming an American citizen in 1994. His daughter Elena Bonham Carter (née Propper de Callejón) married British banker Raymond Bonham Carter, making Golders Green in north London her residence.

Between 1936 and 1939, Propper de Callejón worked in Paris and divided his time between a flat in Paris on Rue de Surène and the Fould-Springer estate, the Chateau Royaumont (acquired in 1923 by Eugène Fould-Springer and his wife) located near Chantilly north of Paris.

== Legacy ==
He never gained public recognition for his heroic acts before his death in 1972 in London after an operation. It is unknown exactly how many lives he saved due to the consulate's registries being burned after the war, but it is estimated to be in the thousands.

In 2007, he was officially recognized as a Righteous Among the Nations by Yad Vashem, the Holocaust remembrance authority in Israel. That was accomplished by the testimony of Austrian Archduke Otto von Habsburg, who had disclosed his knowledge of Propper de Callejón's actions at the Nazi occupation of France during an interview with Felix Pfeifle for the film Felix Austria (2012). Propper de Callejón personally signed the transit visas for Archduke Otto von Hapsburg and his mother, Empress Zita to escape Europe.

In 2019, research conducted for the televised Channel 4 documentary programme My Grandparents' War discovered physical passports found by an American descendent revealing Propper de Callejón's signatures from 1940. The family he saved included the man who would later be the founder of UNICEF, Ludwik Rajchman.

Propper de Callejón is the only foreign representative to have encountered the Jewish refugee crisis in Vichy who had considerable Jewish heritage despite identifying as a Spanish Loyalist and Catholic.

== Notable people issued visas by Propper de Callejón ==
- Ludwik Rajchman and family, founder of UNICEF
- Archduke Otto von Hapsburg
- Empress Zita

== Filmography ==
My Grandparents' War, Season 1, Episode 1 on (PBS, U.S.) and (Channel 4, U.K.).

== See also ==
- Francoist Spain and the Holocaust
- Individuals and groups assisting Jews during the Holocaust
- Righteous Among the Nations

== Sources ==
- Cervantes Institute of New York, Tribute to Eduardo Propper de Callejón. Bordeaux 1940: The Humanitarian Work of a Spanish Diplomat (exp. catalogue), New York, Instituto Cervantes - The International Raoul Wallenberg Foundation, 2006
- M. Paldiel, Diplomat Heroes of the Holocaust, Jersey City, KTAV Publishing House, 2007, p. 204
- JA Lisbona, “Eduardo Propper and de Callejón. The Granting of Transit Visas,” in Beyond the Call of Duty: The Humanitarian Response of the Foreign Service to the Holocaust, Madrid, Ministry of Foreign Affairs and Cooperation, 2015, pp. 265–280
- McAuley, James K. (2012). Decision in Bordeaux: Eduardo Propper de Callejón, the Problem of the Jewish Refugees, and Actor-Network Theory in Vichy France, 19401-1941. Harvard University. OCLC 795840444.
