= Fernand Halphen =

French Jewish composer

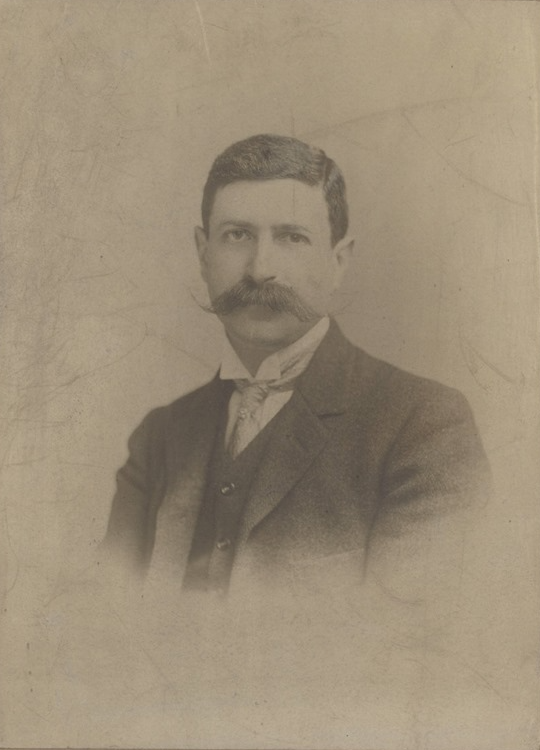
- Born: 18 February 1872; Paris
- Died: 16 May 1917 (aged 45)
- Era: 20th century
- Spouse: Alice de Kœnigswarter (m. 1899)

Fernand Gustave Halphen (18 February 1872 – 16 May 1917) was a French Jewish composer.

== Life and career ==
Fernand Halphen was the son of Georges Halphen, a diamond merchant, and of Henriette Antonia Stern (1836–1905), who was from the Stern banking family. From the age of ten, he studied under the direction of Gabriel Fauré before entering the Paris Conservatory where he took a composition course taught by Ernest Guiraud, who also taught Paul Dukas, Claude Debussy and Erik Satie. After Guiraud's death in 1892, Halphen studied with Jules Massenet, who also taught Henri Rabaud, Florent Schmitt, Charles Koechlin and Reynaldo Hahn. He won first prize for his fugue in 1895, and the next year won second place for the second Grand Prix de Rome with his cantata Mélusine, behind Jules Mouquet and Richard d'Ivry.

Fernand Halphen is known principally as a composer. Among his notable works are the one-act opera Le Cor Fleuri (libretto by Ephraïm Mikhael and André-Ferdinand Hérold), which debuted in the national theatre Opéra-Comique, 10 May 1904, several symphonies, one of which was performed in Paris and in Monte Carlo, a suite for orchestra, the pantomime Hagoseida, the ballet Le Réveil du faune, some chamber music such as a sonata for violin and piano, works for organ as well as songs.

Halphen served as a lieutenant in the thirteenth territorial infantry regiment during World War I. Suffering from diphtheria contracted at the front, he was repatriated to Paris on 1 May 1917, and died on May 16.

=== Personal life ===
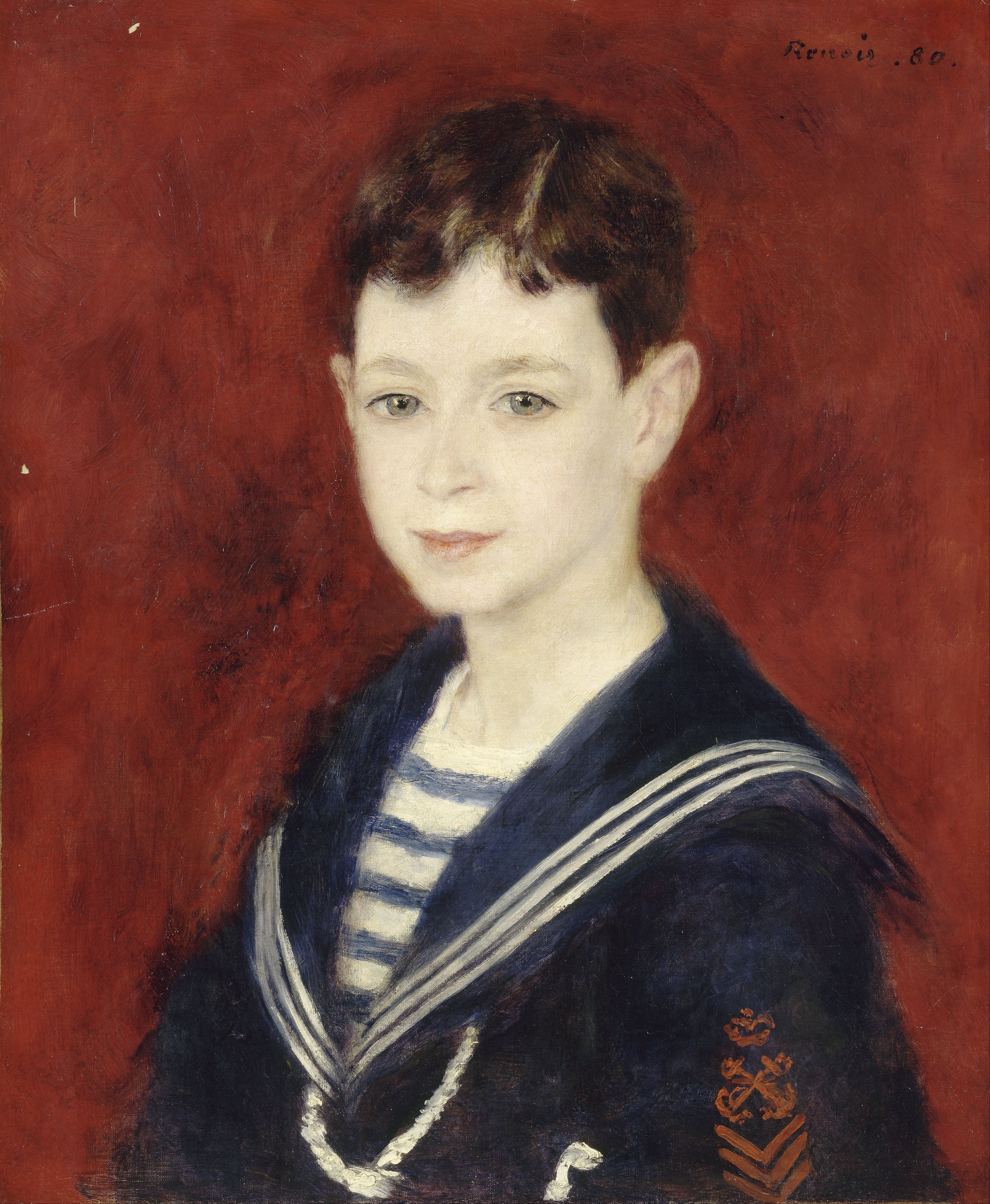
Auguste Renoir - Fernand Halphen as a Boy - Google Art Project

On 15 February 1899, Fernand Halphen married Alice de Kœnigswarter (1878–1963). She also assembled an important collection of paintings including the works of Monet, Pissarro and of Henri Rousseau, as well as the portrait of Fernand Halphen which was painted by Renoir in 1880.

The couple had one daughter, Henriette, born on 26 February 1911, and one son, Georges, born 9 March 1913. In 1995, Georges Halphen offered the portrait of his father, painted by Renoir, to the Musée d'Orsay. It was to offer his wife a view which enchanted her, he said, that Fernand Halphen bought the house at la Chapelle-en-Serval, near Chantilly (Oise) and decided in 1908 to erect a country house in a wooded valley there: the château Mont-Royal.

His niece, Germaine (1884-1975) married Baron Édouard de Rothschild of the prominent Rothschild banking family of France.

== Halphen Foundation ==
Alice Halphen created the Halphen Foundation (Fondation Halphen) whose purpose was to help students of composition in the Conservatory to publish and perform their works.

The Foundation also created social housing on the Ile St. Louis in Paris, taking advantage of a controversial scheme to demolish one side of an original, seventeenth-century street. 10-12 rue des Deux-Ponts housed around 50 rent-controlled apartments in two blocks dating from 1926 and 1930 and aimed at large families. In the round-ups of Jews at the end of September 1942, all 112 tenants, among them 40 young children, were deported to Auschwitz-Birkenau.

By 2003, the apartment block had deteriorated but still housed low-income tenants, some of whom had lived there for decades, in what is France's single most expensive district for real estate. By 2004, the tenants had all left and developers began a major overhaul, marketing "luxurious, prestigious" one- to four-bedroomed air-conditioned apartments. The first act of the builders renovating the building was to chisel off the coloured mosaic plaque above the main entrance, bearing the words "Fondation Fernand Halphen 1926". No trace of the Foundation's presence remains. In August 2006, a one-bedroom apartment in the building was on sale for 600,000 euros, 39.7 times the annual gross French minimum wage.

== Works, editions, recordings ==
His chief works are:

- a Sicilian, a suite for orchestra, 1896
- a symphony, Monte Carlo, 1897
- a sonata for piano and violin, 1899
- "Le Cor Fleuri", lyric opera in one act, based on the play by the late Ephraim Micaël

He also composed several songs, and pieces for the piano, violin, horn, etc

- Mélodies, pieces for piano & chamber music (2CD): Jeff Cohen (piano), Alexis Galpérine (violin), François Le Roux (baritone), Jean McManama (horn), Clara Novakova (flute), Sonia Wieder-Atherton (cello). Patrimoines musicaux des juifs de France, vol. 5 (2006). Orphée d'or 2007 of the Académie du Disque Lyrique, and Prix Gabriel Fauré 2007.

== See also ==
- Halphen
