= The Closed Circle: An Interpretation of the Arabs =

1989 book by David Pryce-Jones

- Title page for The Closed Circle: An Interpretation of the Arabs (1989)
- Author: David Pryce-Jones
- Language: English
- Genre: Non-fiction
- Publisher: Harper & Row
- Publication date: 1989

The Closed Circle: An interpretation of the Arabs is a 1989 book by author David Pryce-Jones that was published by Harper & Row.

== Summary ==
This book discusses the tribal roots of Arab society which form the basis of its cultural traditions. The author documents the cultural forces which drive the violence and mayhem that, in his view, is characteristic of Arab societies in their dealings with each other and with the West.

The author argues that the Arab world is stuck in an age-old tribalism and behavior from which it is unable to evolve. In tribal society, loyalty is extended to close kin and other members of the tribe. In the Arab world those who seek power achieve it by plotting secretly and ruthlessly eliminating their rivals.

== Table of contents ==
- Tribal Society and Its Legacy
- Shame and Honor
- Western Approaches
- Power Challenging and Careerism
- Men and Women
- The Turkish Example
- Colonialism
- The Impact of Nazism
- The Impact of Communism
- Arabia and Oil
- The Issue of Palestine
- Power Holders
- Image and Identity
- Conclusion

== See also ==
- The Arab Mind
- The Bell Curve
- The Camp of the Saints
- Anti-Arabism
