= Villa Furtado-Heine =

Historic French mansion

Coordinates: 43.6939°N 7.2524°E

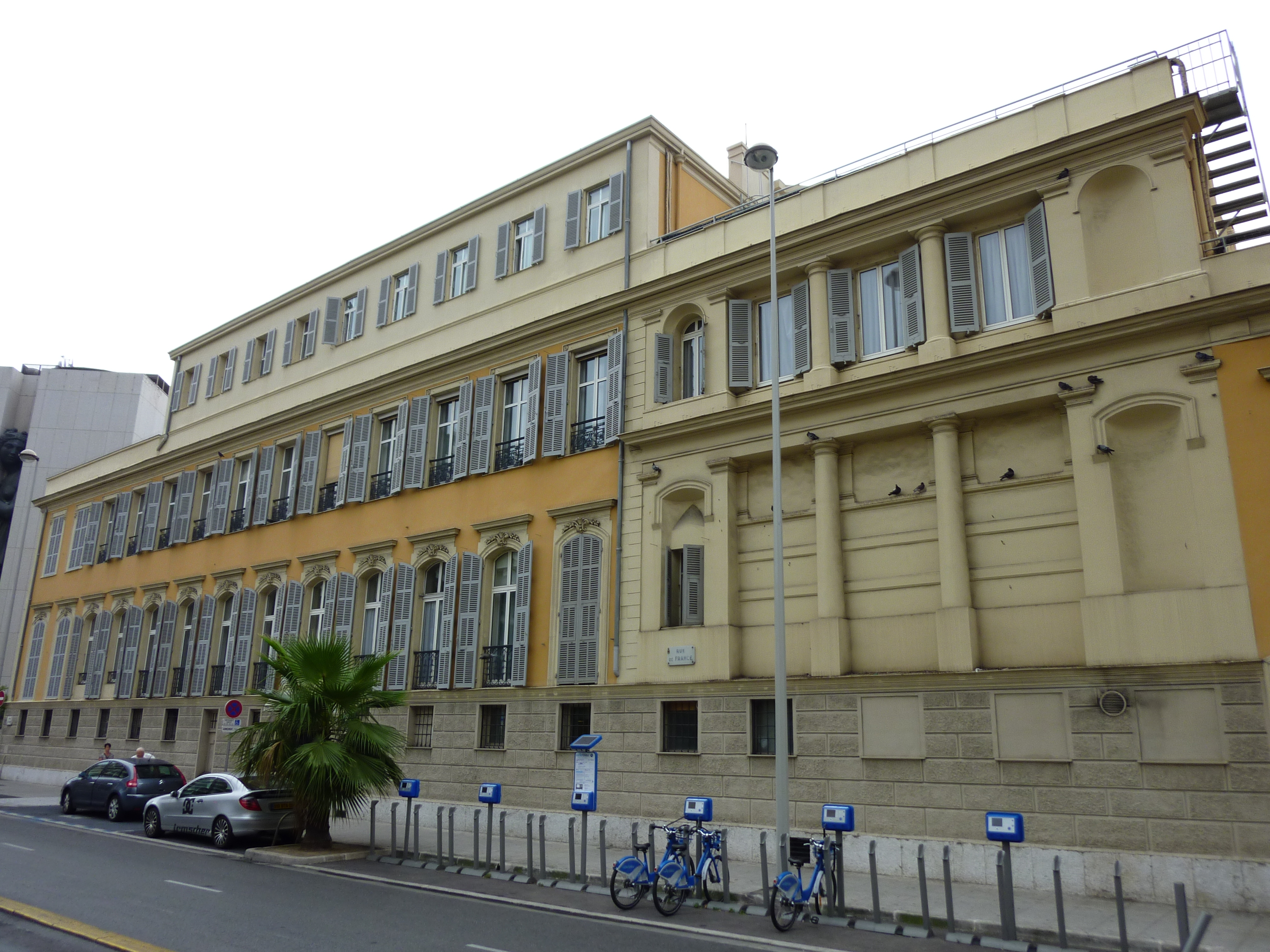
Villa Furtado-Heine.

Villa Furtado-Heine is a historic mansion in Nice, Alpes-Maritimes, France. It was built from 1784 to 1787.

It was the home of French-Jewish philanthropist Cécile Furtado-Heine, who donated it to the government for the convalescent of army officers following return of the French expeditionary force of Madagascar. It has been listed as an official national monument since June 10, 1961.
