= Lost Soulz =

- Poster
- Directed by: Katherine Propper
- Written by: Katherine Propper
- Produced by: Andres Figueredo Thomson; Juan Carlos Figueredo Thomson
- Starring: Sauve Sidle; Aaron Melloul; Krystall Poppin
- Cinematography: Donald R. Monroe
- Edited by: Isaac Burns
- Music by: Jonathan "Zig" Zighelboim (songs); Malachi Mabson (songs); Shawn Sutta (score); Adam Robl (score)
- Distributed by: Kino Lorber
- Release dates: June 11, 2023 (Tribeca); May 3, 2024 (United States)
- Running time: 95 minutes
- Country: United States
- Language: English

Lost Soulz is a 2023 American drama film written and directed by Katherine Propper in her directorial debut. It was released on May 3, 2024, by Kino Lorber.

== Plot ==
When aspiring rapper Sol is discovered by a group of gen-Z musicians at a party, he joins their tour through the heart of Texas and embarks on a once-in-a-lifetime adventure.

As Sol and the band head out West, they bond over their shared pains and longings from the lives they left behind. Vibrant and bold, yet sensitive and vulnerable, these musicians pour their souls into the music they create together.

The novelty of Sol’s newfound family fades as the demons Sol left behind come back to haunt him, including his guilt over abandoning his ailing friend, Wesley. His sense of self is put to the ultimate test as he seeks refuge from the rootlessness and loss that has defined his existence.

== Cast ==
- Sauve Sidle as Sol
- Aaron Melloul as Seven
- Krystall Poppin as Nina
- Micro TDH as Froggy
- Alex Brackney as Mao
- Malachi Mabson as Kai
- Tauran Ambroise as Big Loko
- Siyanda "Yung Bambi" Stillwell as Wesley

== Production ==
=== Development ===
While attending graduate school at the University of Texas Austin, Katherine Propper met aspiring rapper Sauve Sidle off of Craigslist while casting a school project in 2016. They collaborated again when Sidle acted as the lead in Propper's short film "Street Flame," which went on to screen at the Tribeca Film Festival. In 2018, Sidle moved to Los Angeles on a whim to pursue his music career. He traveled with his new friend Juice Wrld on a genre-defining world tour and joined a music collective with rapper Lil Mosey. Some of Sidle's experiences being an indie rapper and going on tour inspired the screenplay of Lost Soulz.

=== Filming ===
Filming took place in Texas cities Austin, Johnson City, Marfa, and El Paso. All of the lead actors in the film are real-life musicians and performers.

== Release ==
Lost Soulz had its world premiere at the Tribeca Film Festival in the U.S. Narrative Competition on June 11, 2023, winning the runner-up Audience Award. It screened internationally at Raindance in the United Kingdom, Tallinn Black Nights in Estonia, Gijón International Film Festival in Spain, among others.

Distributor Kino Lorber acquired North American rights.

== Reception ==
Lost Soulz received positive reviews from film critics. It holds an 90% approval rating on review aggregator website Rotten Tomatoes, based on 19 reviews.

Sergio Burstein of Los Angeles Times wrote, "the overall impression is extremely positive, marked by a succession of great performances(no one is out of place) and by an incidental soundtrack that is created on the fly, before our eyes and ears."

Ross McIndoe of Slant praised the film as a "movie driven by good vibrations and the joy of making music." He describes, "That’s really what Lost Soulz is about—an attempt to capture the moment even as it’s escaping you. Graffiti is a recurring motif, with the crew doodling on almost every unattended surface they come across. A bit of color splashed on to the world to simply say, “I was here.”"

...Late in the film, we hear a Biblical quotation—“One generation passes away, and another comes…The sun also rises, and the sun goes down, and hastens to the place where it arose”—that the whole group already knows in their bones by that point. This sun-dappled part of their lives can’t last forever."

Writing for IndieWire, Christian Zilko wrote effusively about the film's fresh take on a universal tale, "Katherine Propper's directorial debut repackages age-old tropes about the euphoric joys of youth with a sleek aura of Gen-Z authenticity." Zilko notes, "the merry band of hip-hop prodigies embrace their adventure with the kind of euphoric enthusiasm that only exists through the eyes of somebody seeing the world for the first time. Every little side quest and tangent, from taking photos in front of a Prada store to discussing cattle with elderly roadside farmers, is treated like a climactic adventure."

== Awards and nominations ==
Year	Award	Category	Recipient	Result	Ref.
2025	Houston Film Critics Society Awards	Texas Independent Film Award	Lost Soulz	Nominated	
2024	Cleveland International Film Festival	New Direction Competition	Katherine Propper	Nominated	
2023	Tribeca Film Festival	Best U.S. Narrative Feature	Katherine Propper	Nominated	
2023	Tribeca Film Festival	Audience Award - Narrative Feature Runner Up	Katherine Propper	Won	
2023	Raindance Film Festival	Best Debut Feature	Katherine Propper	Nominated	
2023	Tallgrass International Film Festival	Stubbornly Independent Award - Grand Jury Prize	Katherine Propper	Won	
