= Beer Léon Fould =

French-Jewish banker

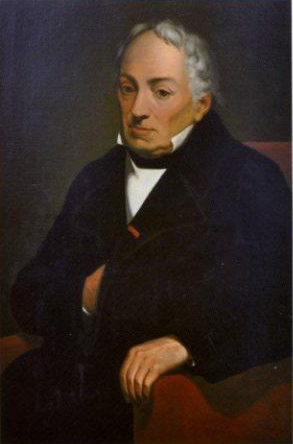
- Born: 5 March 1767; Boulay-Moselle, Lorraine
- Died: 14 May 1855 (aged 88); Paris
- Occupation: Banker

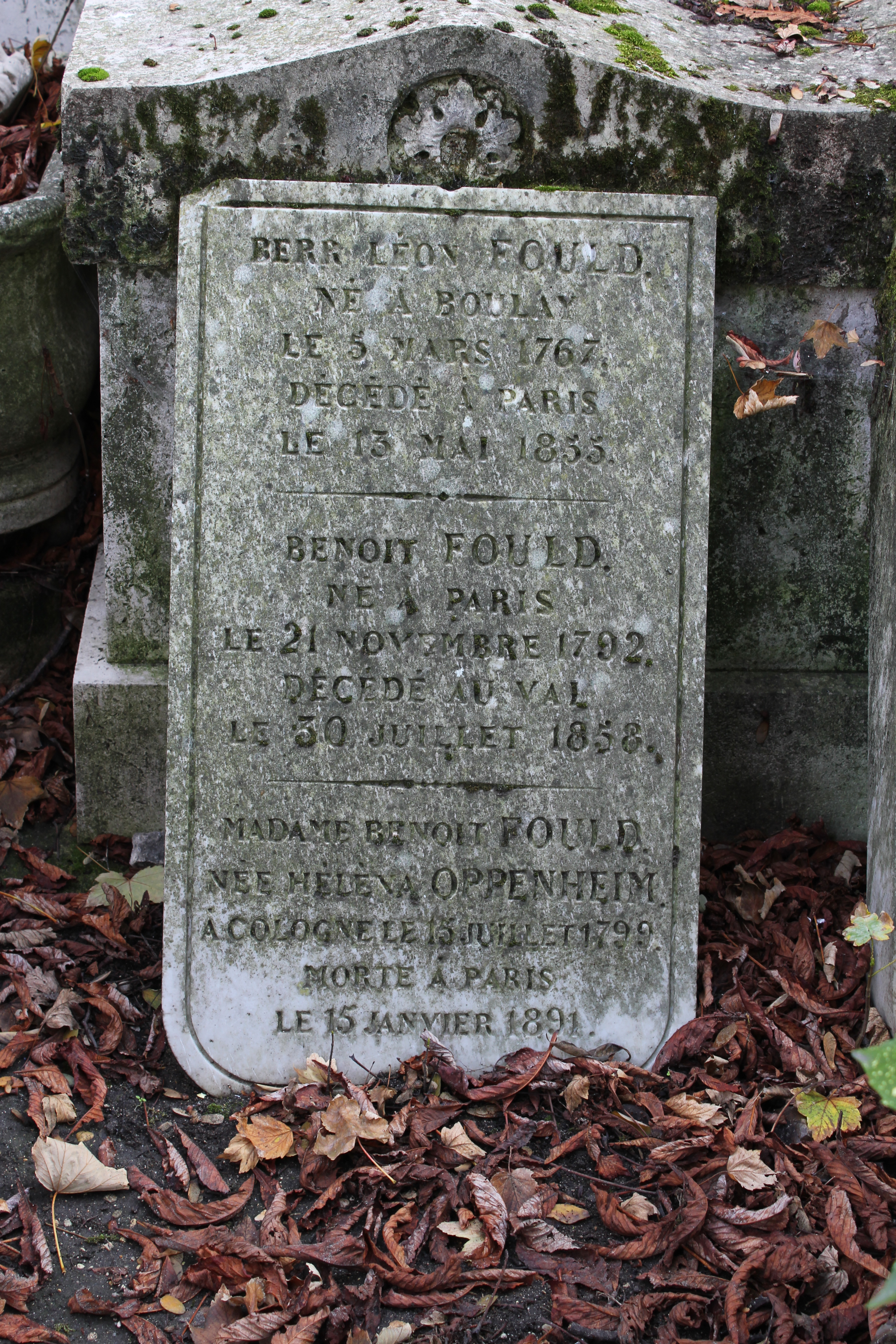
Tomb of Fould

Beer Léon Fould (French: [bɛʁ leɔ̃ fuld]; 5 March 1767 – 14 May 1855) was a French-Jewish banker, and the founder of the Fould banking dynasty.

Born in Boulay-Moselle as the son of Jacob Bernard Fould, a small-time wine dealer, he began working for Herz Cerfbeer of Medelsheim, being sent to Paris in 1784. He started his own banking business in the 1790s, which became particular influential during the Second French Empire.

His eldest son Benoît Fould succeeded him as leader of the family banking business. His third son Achille Fould was four times French Finance minister and a major political figure under Napoleon III.

== See also ==
- Rothschild banking family of France
- Pereire brothers
