= Gustave Halphen =

French diplomat and merchant

Gustave Halphern
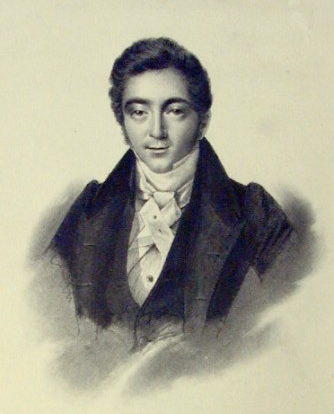
- Died: 1872
- Occupation: Diplomat
- Relatives: Eugène Halphen (brother)

Gustave Halphen (3 March 1810 in Paris–21 February 1872 in Paris) was a French diplomat and merchant.

He served as the Consul-General of France to the Sublime Porte (Istanbul). He served from 1852 to 1857 as the president and vice president of the Israelite Central Consistory of France. He was an officer of the Legion of Honour.

== Works ==
- Halphen, Gustave (1845). Rapport sur l'exposition publique des produits de l'industrie française de 1844. Paris. OCLC 65052461.
