= Adolphe-Ernest Fould =

French banker and politician

Adolphe-Ernest Fould (17 July 1824 – 13 February 1875) was a French banker and politician. He played a key role in the foundation of Banque de Paris (now part of BNP Paribas) and the Ottoman Bank. He was the son of Achille Fould, who served as French minister of finance during the presidency of Napoleon III.

== See also ==
- Fould family
