= Eugène Halphen =

French historian, poet and book editor (1820–1912)

- Born: 5 July 1820; Paris, France
- Died: 27 December 1912 (aged 92); Paris, France
- Other name: Ugenic Phanhel
- Occupations: Historian, poet, book editor
- Parents: Armand Halphen (father); Pauline Koenigswarter (mother)
- Relatives: Gustave Halphen (brother)

Eugène Halphen (5 July 1820 – 27 December 1912) was a French historian, poet and book editor.

== Early life ==
Eugène Halphen was born on 5 July 1820 in Paris, France.

== Career ==
Halphen was a historian. He also composed poetry under the pen name of Ugenic Phanhel.

Halphen was also a book editor. He edited the letters of poet Nicolas Rapin to his son. He also edited the letters written by Henry IV of France to Maximilien de Béthune, Duke of Sully. Additionally, he edited the diary of Robert Arnauld d'Andilly

== Death ==
Halphen died on 27 December 1912 in Paris, France.

== Works ==
=== As an author ===
- Halphen, Eugène (1878). Enquête sur le baptême du roi Henri IV, 1599. Paris: Champion. OCLC 10745372.
- Phanhel, Ugenic (1888). Coco Gratepain : poème en six chants. Paris: Imperimerie de D. Jouaust. OCLC 460580443.
- Halphen, Eugène (1908). Contes de Romainville. Paris: Plon et Nourrit. OCLC 78929530.
- Halphen, Eugène (1910). Contes à mes nièces. Paris: Imprimerie de Plon-Nourrit. OCLC 80033636.
- Halphen, Eugène (1911). Petites Miettes d'histoire. Paris: Imprimerie de Plon-Nourrit. OCLC 457589723.

=== As an editor ===
- Halphen, Eugène (1866). Lettres inédites du roi Henri IV à Monsieur de Sillery, ambassadeur à Rome, du 1er avril au 27 juin 1600. Paris: A. Aubry. OCLC 717721522.
- Halphen, Eugène (1875). Discours de la bataille de Garennes, Ivry, en mars 1590 par Monseigneur Charles, duc de Mayenne et le Roy de Navarre. Paris. OCLC 682025822.
- Halphen, Eugène (1879). Harangues et lettres inédites du roi Henri IV : suives de lettres inédites du poète Nicolas Rapin et de son fils. Lille: L. Danel. OCLC 53046704.
- Halphen, Eugène (1881). Lettres inédites du roi Henri IV a monsieur de Bellièvre, 1602. Paris: Champion. OCLC 6828397.
- Halphen, Eugène (1885). Documents inédits concernant la prise de Montmélian par le roi Henri IV en 1600. Paris: Librairie des bibliophiles. OCLC 461431341.
- Halphen, Eugène (1886). Discours du roi Henri IV au parlement prononcé le 16 février 1599; Deux billets du roi Henri IV : 1600; Trois pièces concernant l'accusation du duc de Biron : 1602. Paris: Imprimerie Jouaust et Sigaux. OCLC 463935445.
- Halphen, Eugène (1892). Lettres inédites du roi Henri IV à monsieur de Béthune, ambassadeur de France à Rome du 9 mars au 31 juillet 1602. Paris: Champion. OCLC 49437448.
- Halphen, Eugène (1903). Journal inédit de Arnauld d'Andilly, 1625; publié d'après le manuscrit autographe par Eugène Halphen et Jules Halphen. Paris: Champion. OCLC 892316695.
- Halphen, Eugène (1909). Journal inédit d'Arnauld d'Andilly : 1630 à la fin. Paris: Champion. OCLC 716810151.
