= Katherine Propper =

American film director and screenwriter (born 1993)

- Born: Katherine Amy Propper; April 22, 1993 (age 33); Los Angeles, California, U.S.
- Education: Georgetown University (BA); University of Texas at Austin (MFA)
- Occupations: Film director; screenwriter; producer; editor
- Years active: 2013–present

Katherine Amy Propper (born April 22, 1993) is an American film director and screenwriter. She is known for her feature directorial debut film Lost Soulz (2023) and short films.

== Early life and education ==
Propper was born and raised in Los Angeles, California. Her mother is from Korea and her father, of European descent, is from New York. On her father's side, she is a great-granddaughter of Eduardo Propper de Callejon, a Spanish diplomat and a Righteous Among the Nations, and a cousin of British actress Helena Bonham Carter.

Propper attended Georgetown University, graduating with a Bachelor of Arts in Art History.

In 2016, she moved to Austin, Texas to attend the University of Texas at Austin where she received her MFA degree in Film directing. She wrote and directed her student short film Street Flame. The film follows a group of friends in Austin's skate and graffiti scene as they commemorate the life of their dead friend. Street Flame screened at the Tribeca Film Festival in 2019 and won several awards at film festivals.

== Career ==
After completing her studies, she worked in Austin for American director Terrence Malick on the editing team of his long-gestating religious epic. Propper moved to Texas inspired by the independent, free spirit of Austin-based filmmakers like Malick, Richard Linklater, Jeff Nichols, and Robert Rodriguez.

The Austin Film Society supported her short film Birds, featuring intercut vignettes of Texas youths finding beauty on a summer day. Birds won awards at Clermont-Ferrand in France and at South by Southwest in 2022, where it won Special Jury Recognition for Vision. The New Yorker distributed Birds as part of its Screening Room series. TheWrap selected Birds in its 2023 shortlist of the best short films.

Propper's directorial feature-film debut Lost Soulz premiered at the Tribeca Film Festival in 2023. Lost Soulz is a coming-of-age movie about a young rapper whose dream comes true when he joins a music group on an odyssey headed West through Texas and instead finds himself on a spiritual journey home. The film was released by distributor Kino Lorber in the U.S. and Canada in May 2024.

== Filmography ==
=== Feature films ===
Year	Title	Director	Writer	Producer	Notes	Refs
2023	Lost Soulz	Yes	Yes	Co-producer		

=== Short films ===
Year	Title	Director	Writer	Producer	Notes	Refs
2018	Pentecost	Yes	Yes	No	Film editor	
2019	Street Flame	Yes	Yes	Yes	Film editor	
2021	Birds	Yes	Yes	No	Film editor	

== Awards and nominations ==
Award	Year	Category	Nominated work	Result	Ref.
Tribeca Film Festival	2019	Best Narrative Short	Street Flame	Nominated	
Tribeca Film Festival	2023	Best U.S. Narrative Feature	Lost Soulz	Nominated	
Tribeca Film Festival	2023	Audience Award - Narrative Feature Runner Up	Lost Soulz	Won	
SXSW Film Festival	2022	SXSW Grand Jury Award - Texas Short	Birds	Nominated	
SXSW Film Festival	2022	Special Jury Prize for Vision	Birds	Won	
Cleveland International Film Festival	2024	New Direction Competition	Lost Soulz	Nominated	
Nashville Film Festival	2023	New Directors Competition	Lost Soulz	Nominated	
Raindance Film Festival	2023	Best Debut Feature	Lost Soulz	Nominated	
Tallgrass International Film Festival	2023	Stubbornly Independent Award - Grand Jury Prize	Lost Soulz	Won	
American Film Institute Festival	2022	Live Action Short Film	Birds	Won	
Clermont-Ferrand International Short Film Festival	2022	International Competition - Grand Prix	Birds	Nominated	
Clermont-Ferrand International Short Film Festival	2022	International Competition - Special Mention of the Jury	Birds	Won	
Mammoth Lakes Film Festival	2022	Best Narrative Short	Birds	Won	
Stockholm Film Festival	2022	Best Short Film	Birds	Nominated	
Denver International Film Festival	2022	Best Student Domestic Short	Birds	Nominated	
Aspen Shortsfest	2019	Best Drama	Street Flame	Nominated	
Palm Springs International ShortFest	2019	Best Student Film Under 15 Minutes	Street Flame	Nominated	
Sidewalk Film Festival	2019	Best Student Film	Street Flame	Won	
Rhode Island International Film Festival	2019	Best Student Film Award - Short Film	Street Flame	Won	
Oak Cliff Film Festival	2018	Best Student Short	Pentecost	Won	
