= Achille Fould =

French banker and politician

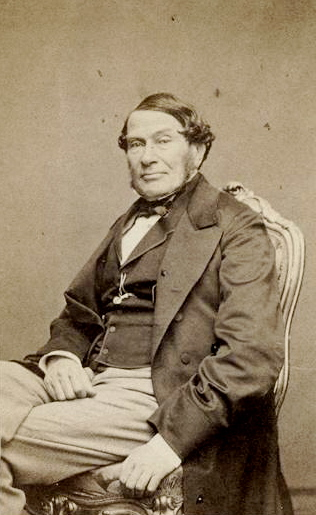
- Born: 17 November 1800; Paris, France
- Died: 5 October 1867 (aged 66); Tarbes, France
- Father: Beer Léon Fould

Achille Marcus Fould (French: [aʃil fuld]; 17 November 1800 – 5 October 1867) was a French financier and politician who was four times minister of finance between 1849 and 1867. A major figure of the Second French Empire, his politics have been described as "conservative by instinct, liberal by reflection."

== Family and personal life ==
Achille Fould was born on 17 November 1800 in Paris, the third son of French Jewish banker Beer Léon Fould and Charlotte née Brullen. In 1823 he married Henriette (Harriet) Goldschmidt (1800–1870), also a banker's daughter and sister of Adolphus Goldsmith. They had three children: Adolphe-Ernest (1824-1875), Charlotte-Amélie (1826-1917), and Gustave Eugène (1836-1884).

In 1847, Fould acquired a property in Tarbes which he subsequently expanded on designs by architect Louis-Jules Bouchot. In 1863, he had another holiday house erected in Vichy, later known as the chalet des roses.

Fould converted to Protestantism in 1858. Following his death in his Tarbes property, his funeral service was held on 14 October 1867 at the Protestant Oratoire du Louvre in Paris, and he was buried at the Père Lachaise Cemetery.

== Career ==
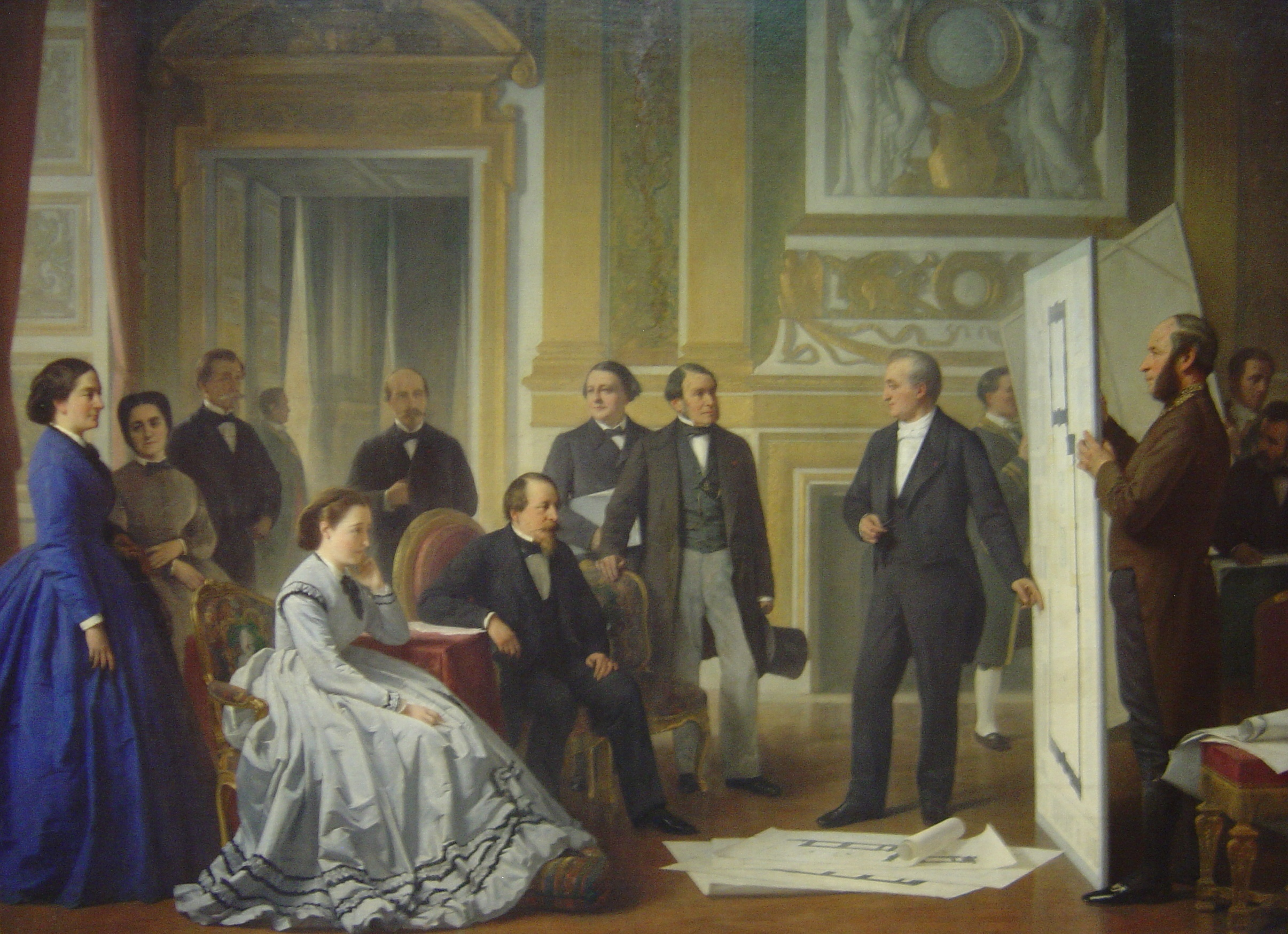
Fould (standing right of center, holding a hat) attending the presentation in 1853 of Louis Visconti's plans for completion of the Louvre to Napoleon III and Empress Eugénie, 1865 painting by Ange Tissier

Achille Fould began his career working for the family bank, which had been started in Paris by his father in 1799 and was later led by his elder brother Benoît Fould. Following the July Revolution in 1830, he acquainted himself with princes of the reigning House of Orléans. In 1834, he was among the founders of the Jockey-Club de Paris.

In 1839, Fould entered politics and was elected a conseiller général in the department of the Hautes-Pyrénées. In 1842, he was elected as a deputy of Hautes-Pyrénées. During subsequent years, he worked in the Chamber of Deputies on economic and fiscal matters.

In 1848, following the revolution of February, he published two pamphlets against the use of paper money, respectively entitled Pas d'Assignats and Observations sur la question financière. He re-entered the National Assembly on 13 September 1848 as deputy of the Seine Department. Despite his past associations with the Orleanists, he moved gradually closer politically to Louis Napoleon, who made him minister of finance on 31 October 1849. He left the ministry in January 1851 but led it again between April and October 1851.

Fould was reappointed as finance minister the day after the coup d'état of December 1851, which he had helped prepare even though he was not directly involved in its execution. On 22 January 1852, following the confiscation of the property of the House of Orléans, he resigned the office of minister of finance but was appointed Senator a few days later. In July 1852, he was appointed Minister of State and in December of the same year, Minister of the Imperial Household, retaining both positions until November 1860. As such, he was one of the most powerful political figures of the Second French Empire, with major influence over economic and financial matters as well as direct authority over prominent national institutions such as the Legion of Honour, the Institut de France, theaters, museums, and libraries. He oversaw Napoleon III's Louvre expansion and directed the Paris Universal Exhibition of 1855. In 1857, he became a member of the Académie des beaux-arts. In 1859, during the absence of Napoleon III who was campaigning in Italy, Fould was effectively in charge of France's government as Secretary of the Privy Council.

Within the new Louvre, Fould was awarded a palatial apartment in the newly built complex later known as the Richelieu Wing, which was also to house the offices of both ministries he led. The suite of ornate rooms was still unfinished when he resigned in late 1860 and was subsequently used by Fould's successor as Minister of State, Alexandre Colonna-Walewski. It later served as official residence of the French Finance Minister from the 1870s to the 1980s. An examplar of the Second Empire style of interior decoration, it became part of the Louvre Museum in 1993 and has been subsequently known as Appartements Napoleon III, sometimes inaccurately referred to as the appartements du duc de Morny. During the second half of the 1850s, Fould's wife Henriette used the Château du Val in Saint-Germain-en-Laye and had it remodeled.

Fould resigned again in November 1860 in protest against Napoleon III's policy announcements which entailed spending which he viewed as imprudent, and retired to his adoptive hometown of Tarbes. From there, he campaigned in favor of greater fiscal discipline. As France was losing the trust of financial markets, Napoleon III eventually reversed course and expressed approval of Fould's views. Fould thus could come back as finance minister on 14 November 1861, succeeding his rival Pierre Magne whom he blamed for excessive laxity. The return of market confidence was crystallized in Napoleon III's visit to James de Rothschild at the latter's Château de Ferrières on 18 December 1862, which Fould orchestrated. Fould then reduced the floating debt by negotiating a loan of 300 million francs (1863).

In view of the regime's sagging popularity at home and growing challenges abroad, the Emperor grew dissatisfied with Fould's fiscal straitjacket and clashed with his finance minister in late 1866. Eventually Napoleon III made Fould resign in January 1867; he was succeeded by stalwart politician Eugène Rouher. Fould spent a few months traveling then again retired to Tarbes, where he died unexpectedly on 5 October 1867.

== Honors ==
Achille Fould was made a chevalier in the Legion of Honour in 1848, officier in 1850, commandeur in late 1851, grand officier in 1854, and eventually grand croix, the highest rank, in 1856.

== Gallery ==
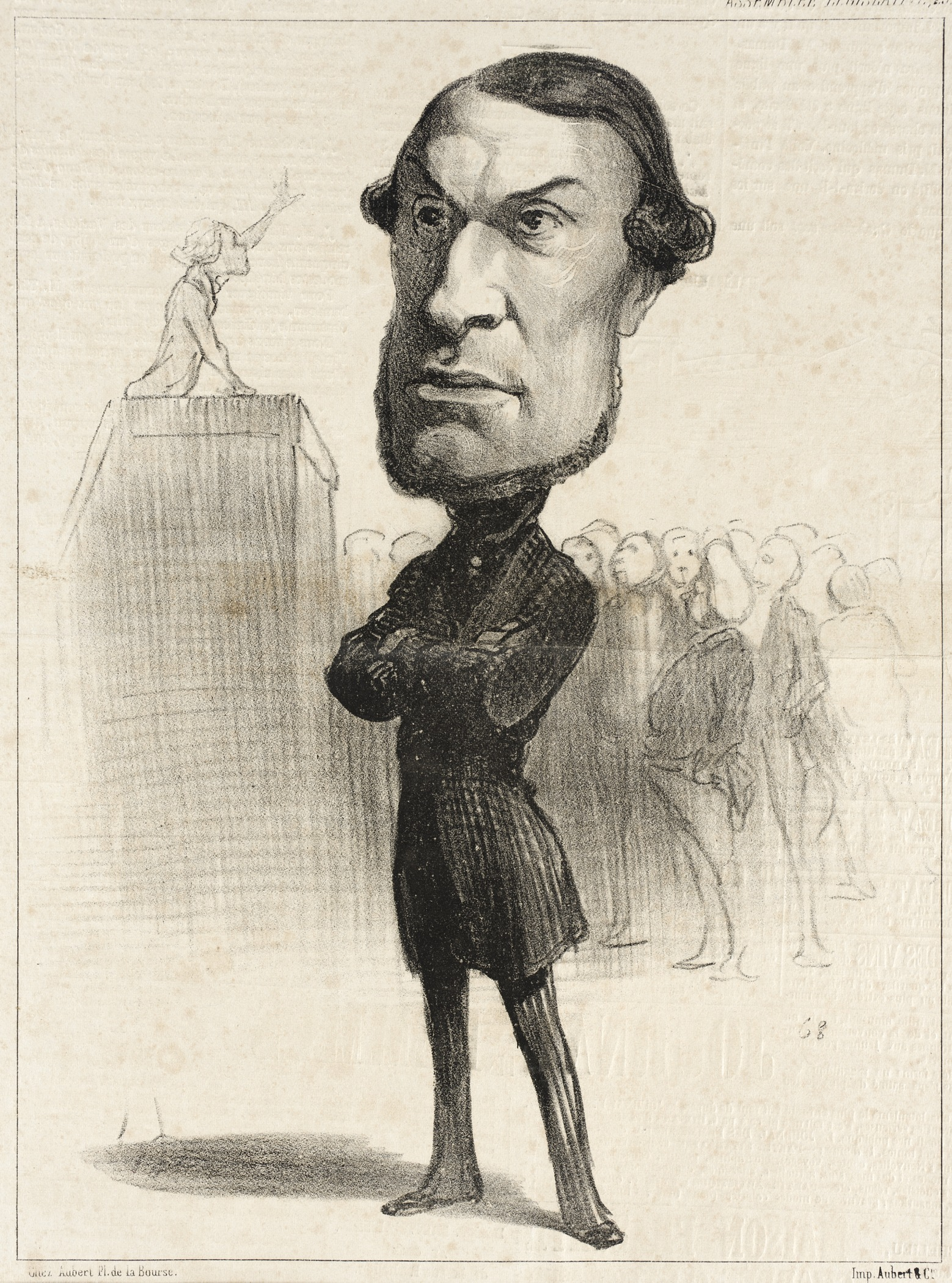
Cartoon of Fould by Honoré Daumier, 1849

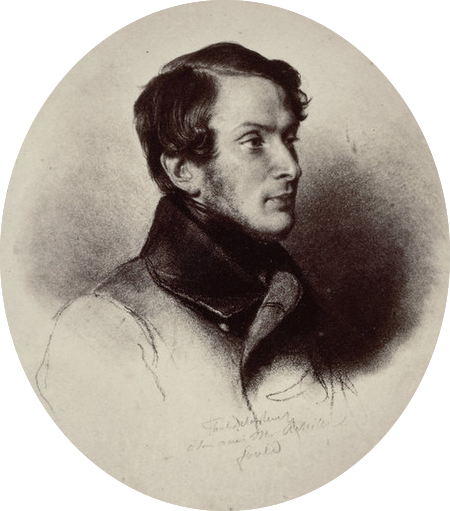
Formal portrait of Fould, 1859

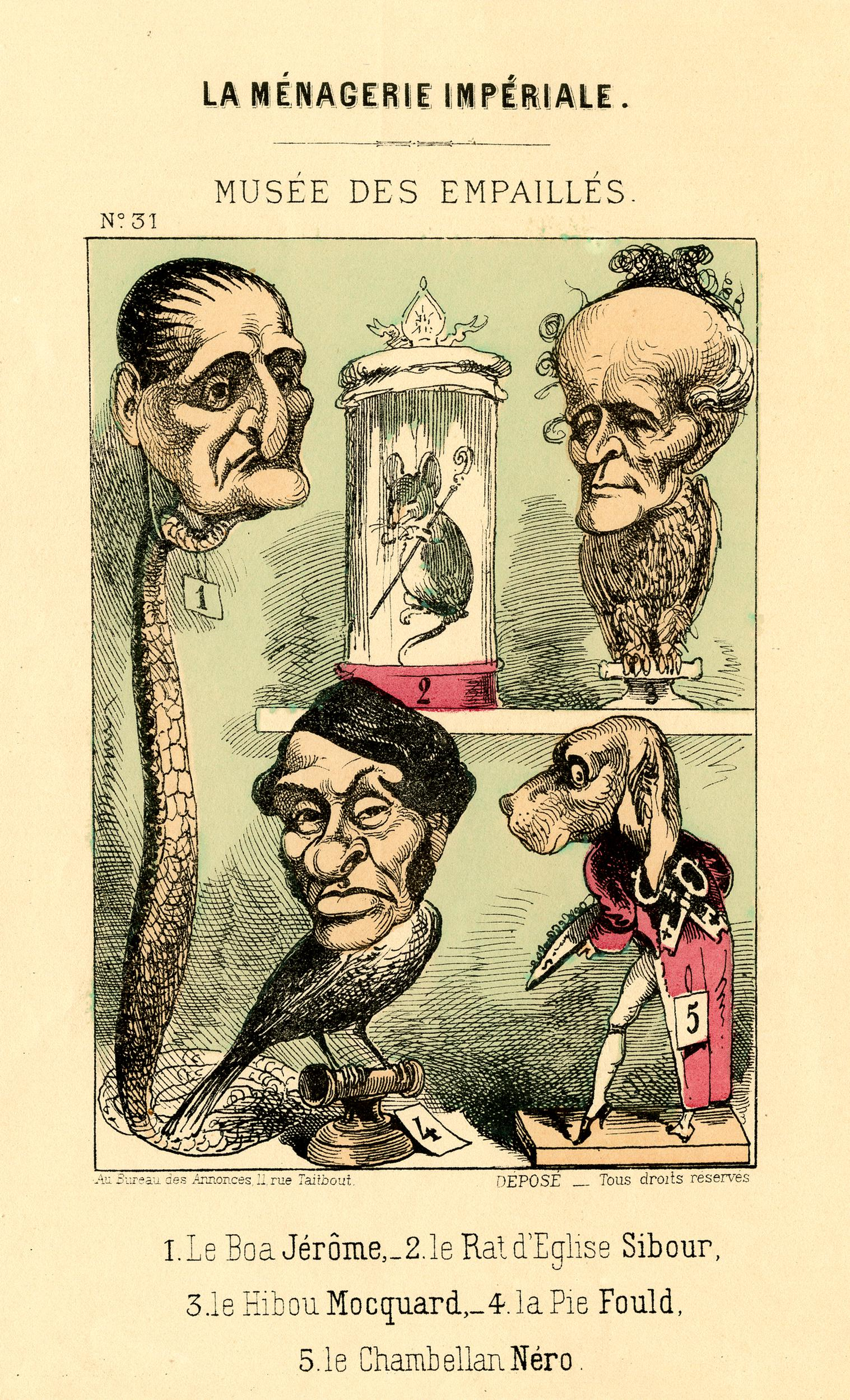
Post-mortem caricature of Fould as a magpie (lower left), 1871

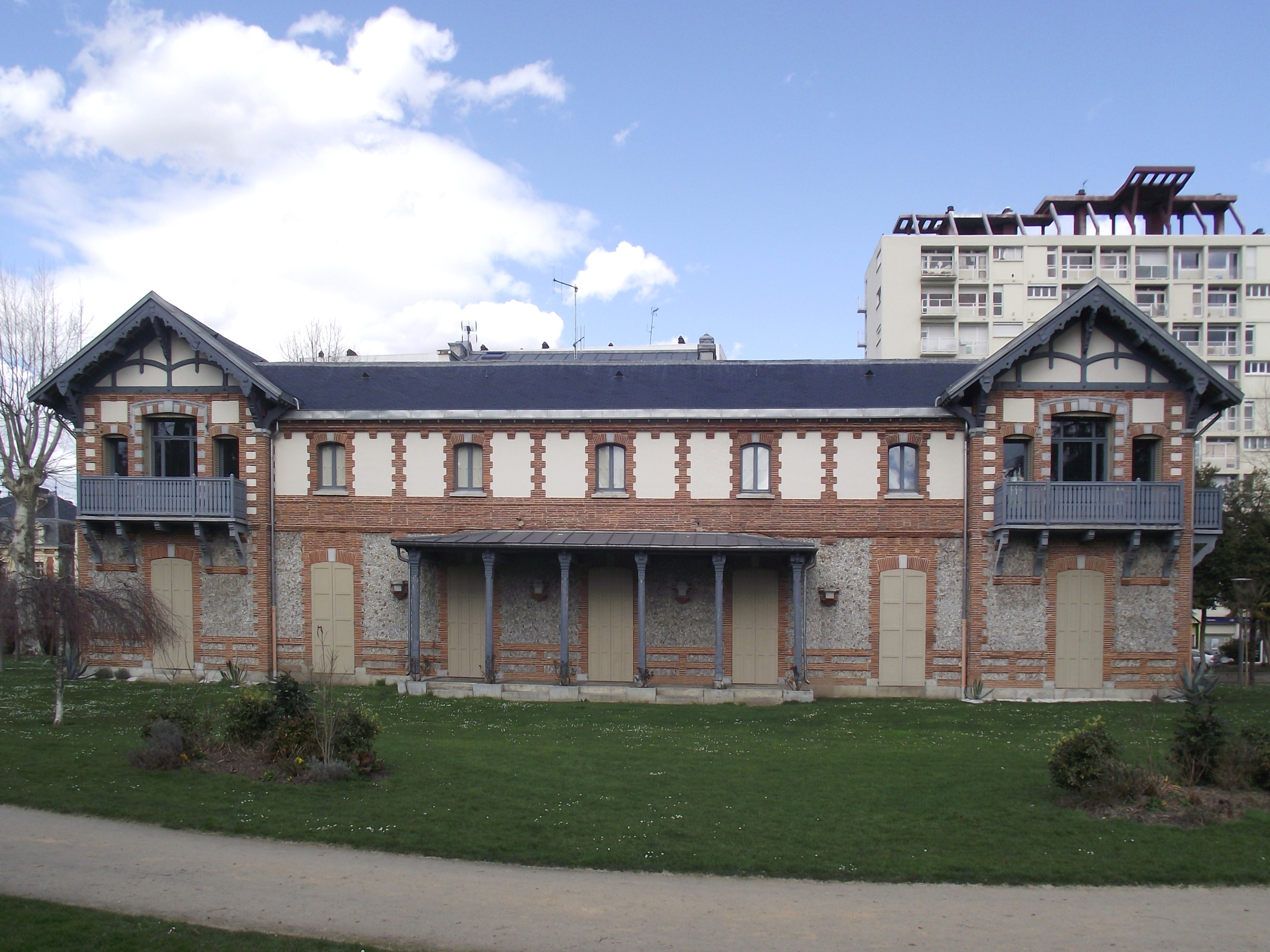
Villa Fould in Tarbes, view from the south

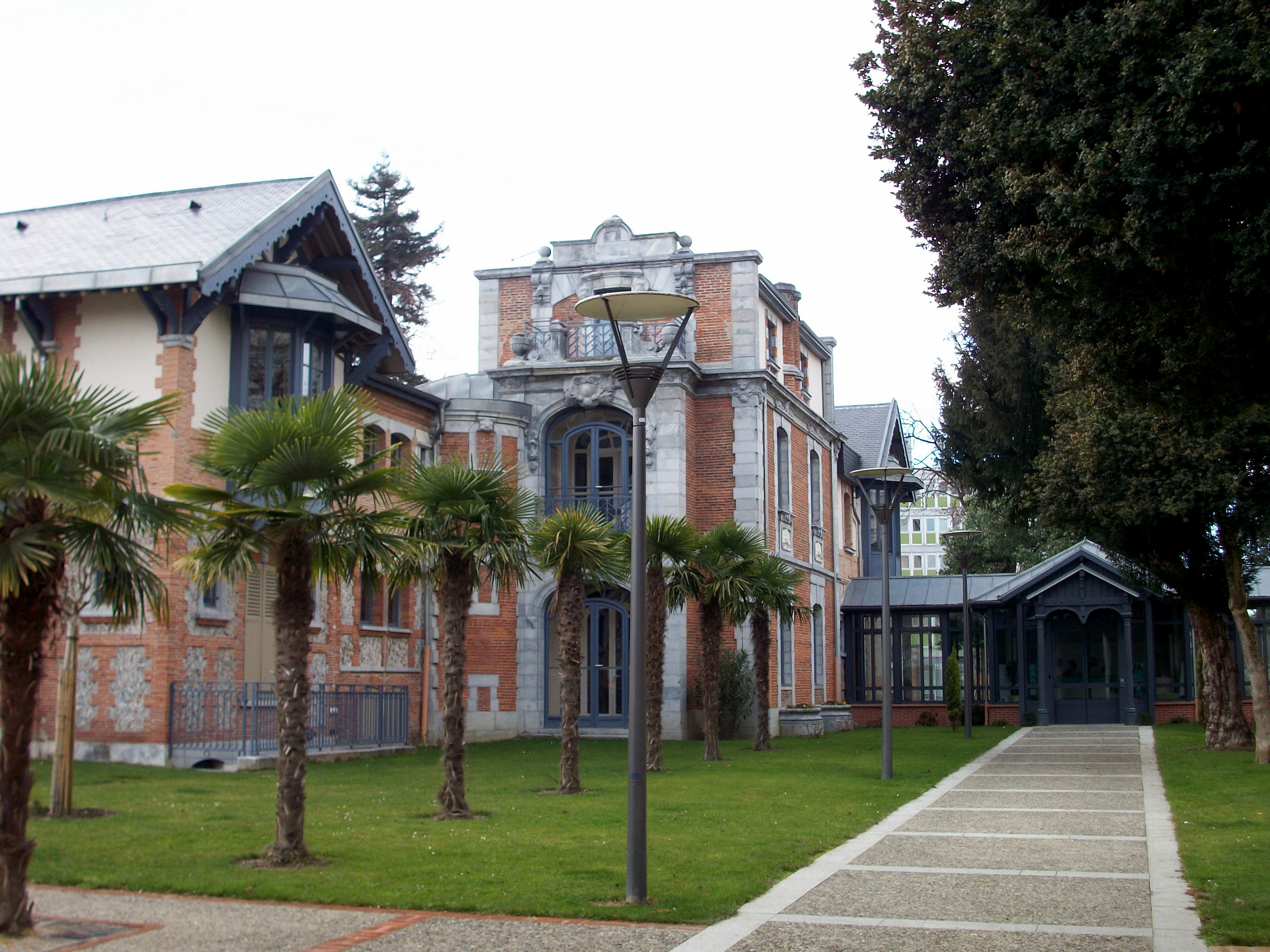
Villa Fould in Tarbes, view from the northeast

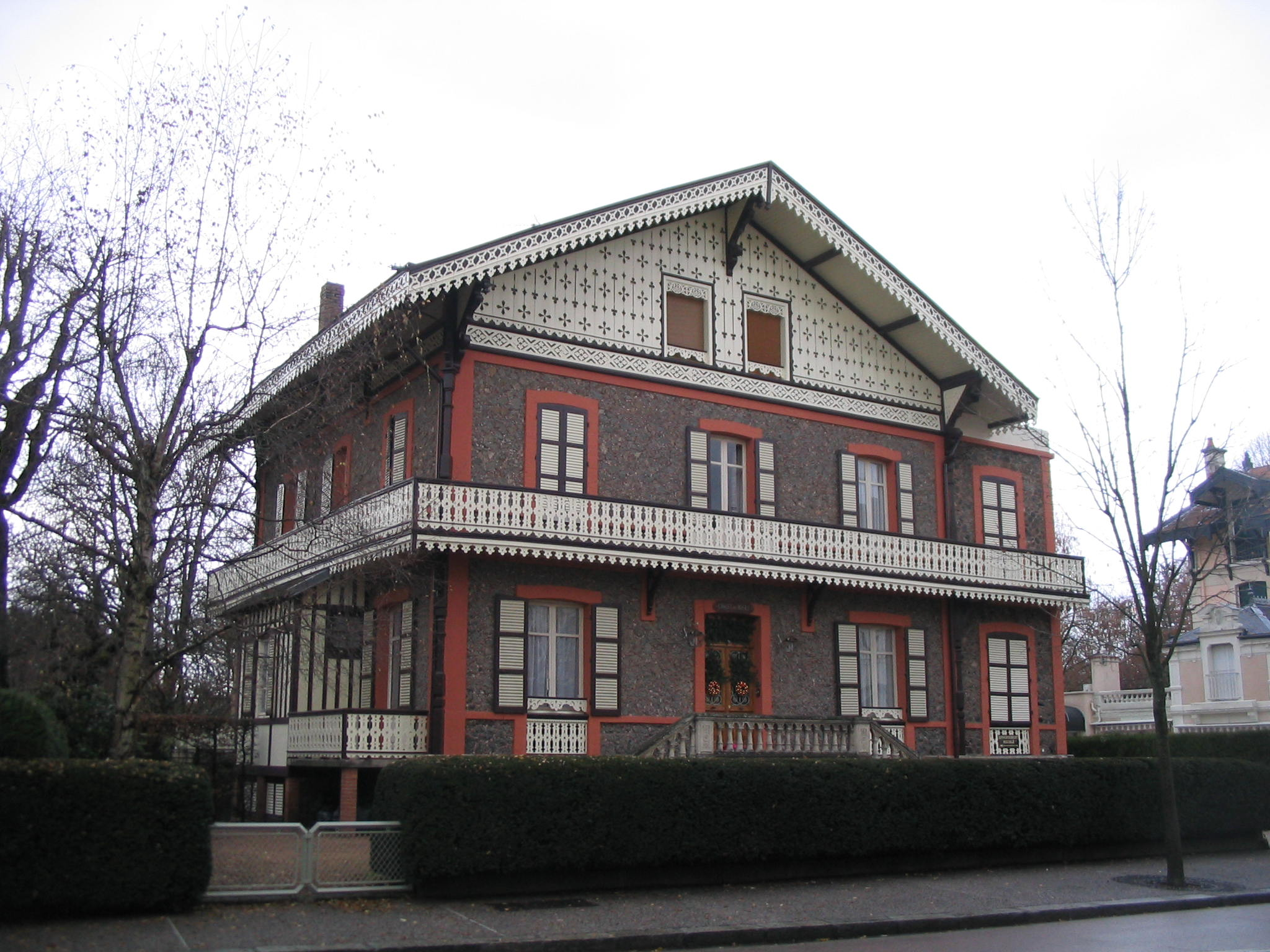
Fould's Chalet des roses in Vichy

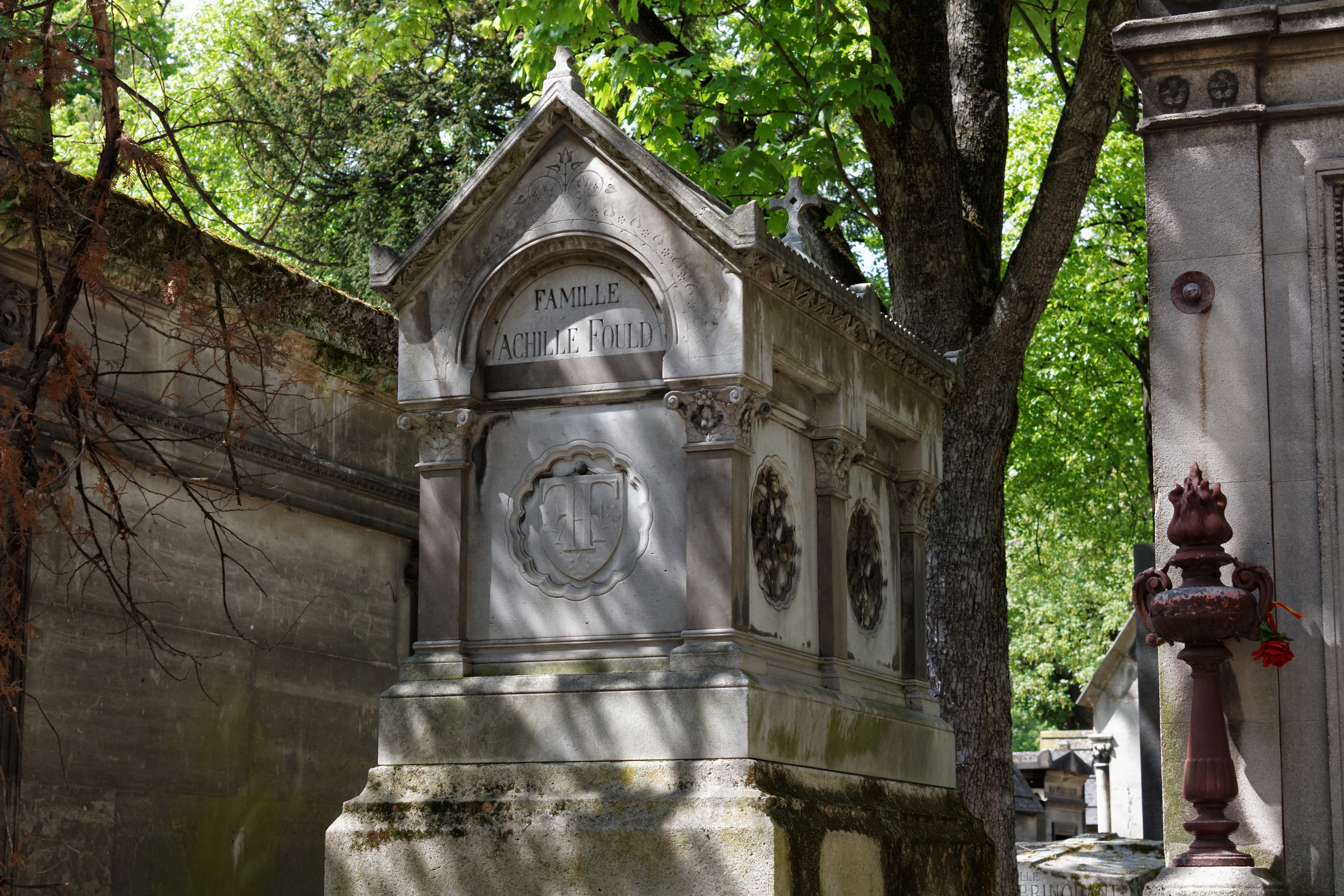
Fould family grave at the Père Lachaise Cemetery

== See also ==
- Rothschild banking family of France
- Jacques Laffitte
- Pereire brothers
- Armand Donon
