= Benoît Fould =

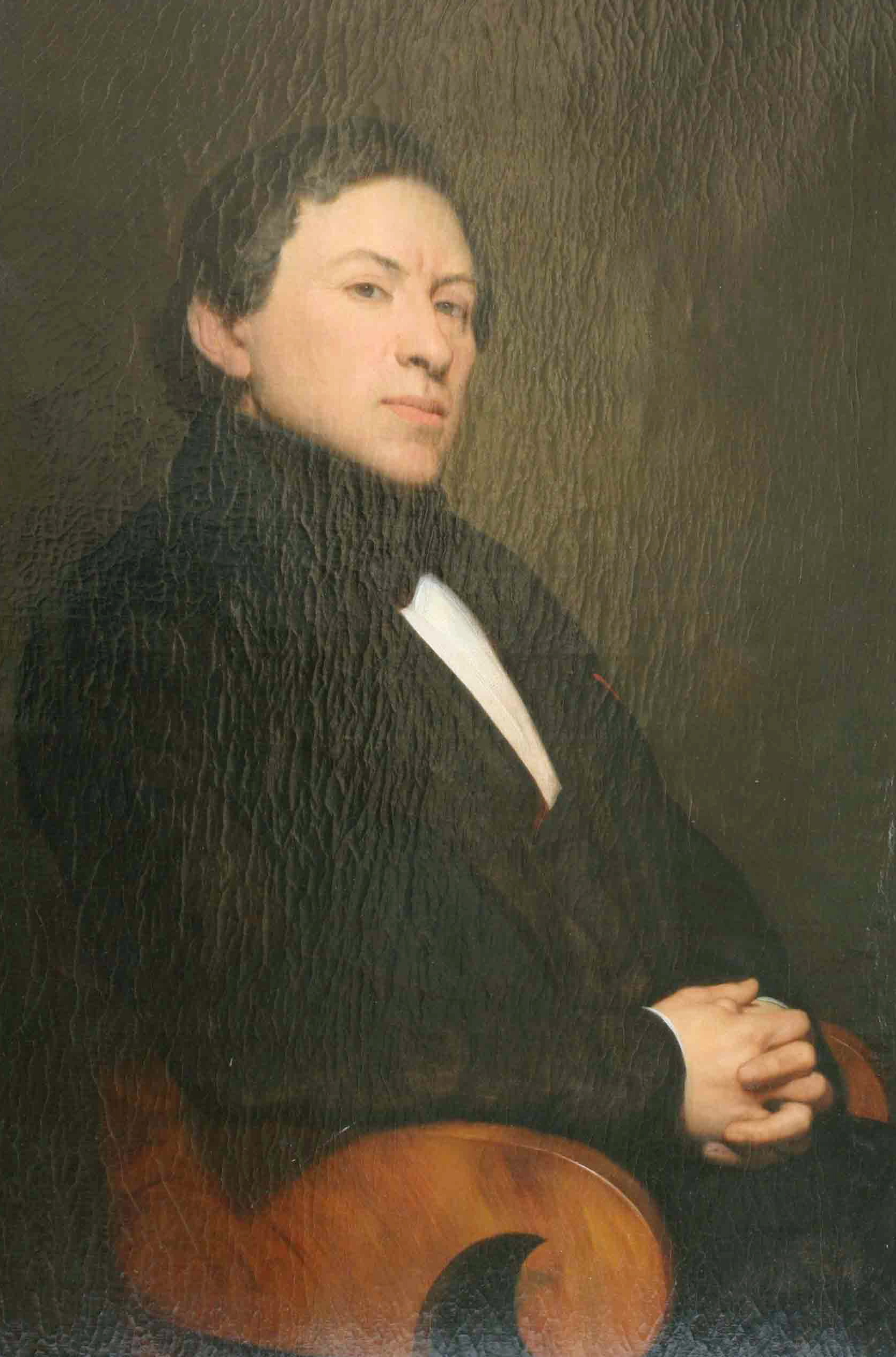
- Benoît Fould (1843), by Ary Scheffer.
- Born: 21 November 1792; Paris, France
- Died: 28 July 1858 (aged 65); Paris, France
- Occupations: Banker, politician

Benoît (Bénédict) Fould (French: [bənwa fuld]; 21 November 1792 – 28 July 1858) was a French banker and scion of the Fould family.

Fould was married to Helena Oppenheim, daughter of Salomon Oppenheim, founder of Sal. Oppenheim private bank. The bride's dowry made part of the initial capital of the new bank, Fould-Oppenheim et Cie. Ferdinand de Lesseps would name Fould as a founder of the Suez Canal Company.
